This is a list of people appointed Member of the Order of the British Empire (MBE) in the 1918 New Year Honours.

The 1918 New Year Honours were appointments by King George V to various orders and honours to reward and highlight good works by citizens of the British Empire. The appointments were published in The London Gazette and The Times in January, February and March 1918.

Unlike the 1917 New Year Honours, the 1918 honours was dominated by rewards for war efforts. As The Times reported: "The New Year Honours represent largely the circumstances of war, and, perhaps, as usual, they also reflect human nature in an obvious form. The list is one of the rare opportunities for the public to scan the names of soldiers who have distinguished themselves in service."

The recipients of the Order of the British Empire were not classified as being within Military or Civilian divisions until following the war.

The recipients of honours are displayed here as they were styled before their new honour and arranged by  division (Military, Civil, etc.) as appropriate.

Member of the Order of the British Empire (MBE)

Military Division 

Capt. John Herbert Ashton, Superintending Ofc., Army Veterinary Corps
Margaret Winifred Atkinson, Superintendent, Cookery Section, Women's Legion
Capt. Albert Raymond Auger, Q.M., Base Depot, Canadian Forestry Corps
Capt. William Edgar Aylwin, Royal Flying Corps
Capt. John Baker, Royal Army Service Corps; Confidential Clerk to Assistant Director of Transport, War Office
Lt.-Col. Harry Hyndman Balfour, RAMC; South African Hospital, Richmond Park
Capt. Douglas Barnes, Commanding No. 2 Depot Battalion, Overseas Training Brigade, Australian Imperial Forces
Lt. Harold Wilmot Barras, Royal Garrison Arty.; Assistant Inspector of Carriages, Ministry of Munitions
Maj. Alexander Barron, Royal Army Service Corps
Maj. David Ernest Bellaney, Remount Service
Magrelinho (he used to enter in the war)
Lt.-Col. William Joseph Bentley, Assistant Director of Dental Services, Canadian Forces
Capt. John Augustus Blay, Q.M.-General's Dept., War Office
Maj. Arthur Blennerhassett, Remount Service
Capt. Lester Browning Booty, Inspector Auditor, Messing Accounts, War Office
Capt. Ernest Bowles, South African Pay Office
Capt. Henry Cecil Boys, Formerly Assistant Inspector of Gun Ammunition (Technical), Ministry of Munitions
Capt. Frederick Henry Ewart Branson, Army Ordnance Dept.
Capt. Edwin Brown, Assistant Inspector of Gun Ammunition (Technical), Ministry of Munitions
Helen Grace Rae Brown, Administrator, Queen Mary's Army Auxiliary Corps
Lt. Herbert Charles Stuart Bullock, Royal Flying Corps
Maj. Charles Duncan Miles Campbell, Royal Flying Corps
Lt.-Col. David Bishop Campbell, Forestry Technical Ofc., Canadian Forestry Corps
Maj. Francis Henry Chalkley, Ordnance Ofc. in Charge of Salvage Depot
Capt. Charles Joseph Charlton, Staff Capt., Canadian Headquarters
Col. Sir John Maurice Clark  Midlothian Territorial Force Association, Ministry of National Service
Lt.-Col. William James Clarke, Royal Field Arty., Assistant Inspector of Carriages, Ministry of Munitions
Capt. Thomas Coates, Superintending Ofc. (Q.M.), General Headquarters, Home Forces
Maj. William Coley, Royal Arty., Q.M., Depot, Argyll and Sutherland Highlanders
Maj. Henry Cooper, Commissary of Ordnance, Woolwich
Sylvia Corner, Q.M., Queen Mary's Army Auxiliary Corps
Lt. Gordon George Crocker, Military Intelligence Branch, War Office
Maj. Roy Victor Cutler  Commanding Australian Engineers Training Depot
Capt. R. J. Durley, in charge of Gauges and Drawings, Canada, Ministry of Munitions
Hester Mary Edwards, Administrator, Woman's Army Auxiliary Corps
Maj. William Farraday, Reserve Mechanical Transport Depot
Capt. Alexander Fenton, in charge of Technical Warehouse, Canadian Forestry Corps
Lt.-Col. Alpin Ferguson, Deputy Assistant Director of Timber Operations, Canadian Forestry Corps
May Finlay, Superintendent, Cookery Section, Women's Legion
Capt. Harold Fortescue Flannery, Late Proof Ofc., Canada, Ministry of Munitions
Lt.-Col. John James Fry, Deputy Director of Transport, Canadian Forces
Lt. William Henry Gregory Geake, Assistant at Munitions Inventions Dept., Experimental Ground
Jane Margaret Francis Gibson, Superintendent, Cookery Section, Women's Legion
Lt. Richard Jones, in charge of Materials, Mechanical Transport Depot, Kempton Park
Lt. Herbert Alfred Joy, Royal Arty., Estimating Ofc., Coast Defence Armament
Maj. Wybrants Judge, Q.M., Rifle Depot, Winchester
Lt. John James Keene, Confidential Clerk, War Office
Capt. Frederick Keough, Q.M., No. 4 Reserve Brigade, Royal Field Arty.
Maj. Robert John Lapham, Army Service Corps
Maj. Herbert Laurie, Remount Service
Capt. James Lawrence, Royal Army Service Corps; Chief Clerk, Supplies Branch, War Office
Maj. Clive Leese, Inspecting Ofc. to Mechanical Transport, Ministry of Munitions
Maj. Edwin Philip Le Mesurier, Jersey Militia; Area Cmdr., White City, West London
Capt. John Walter Litchfield, Assistant Inspector, Army Ordnance Depot, Woolwich
Maj. Owen Lobley, Canadian Army Pay Corps
Capt. Henry John Leicester Longden, Inspector of Army Schools
Capt. Arthur Henry Lowe, in charge of Army Ordnance Depot, Aintree
Capt. Dudley Owen Lumley, Wiltshire Reg.; Deputy Assistant Inspector of Recruiting, Southern Command
Capt. Thomas Lyons, Deputy Assistant Director of Aircraft Equipment, Air Board
Capt. William Charles McCutchan  Adjutant, Australian Signal Training Depot
Capt. Alexander McDonald, Assistant Inspector of Guns, Ministry of Munitions
Maj. the Reverend John Howard MacDonald  Canadian Headquarters Staff
Lt. William Henry George Maton, Royal Arty., Ordnance Dept., War Office
Lt. Thomas Matthews, Royal Garrison Arty.
Lt.-Col. Henry George Mayes, Director, Canadian Army Gymnastic Staff
Lt. Frederick George Middleton, Royal Engineers, Inspector, Royal Engineer Machinery, War Office
Lt. James Edward Moberly, Assistant Engineer, Ministry of Munitions, No. 7 Area (Metropolitan)
Capt. William Morgan, Royal Engineers, Q.M., Northern Command
Lt. John William Mort
Lt. Frederick Montague Augustus Morris, Assistant to Staff Capt., War Office
Lt. James Thomas Morton Clarke, Q.M.-General's Dept., War Office
Maj. George Alexander Stokes Nairn, Supervising Military Representative of No. 4 District; Assistant Inspector of Recruiting, Western Command
Maj. John Arnold Neale, Australian Imperial Force, in charge of Australian Records
Lt. Thomas Neame, Works Manager, Messrs. Stewarts & Lloyds, Ltd., Birmingham
Capt. Richard Trevor Tudor Owen, Montgomeryshire Yeomanry; Assistant Inspector of Small Arms, Ministry of Munitions
Capt. Percy Frank Parker, Royal Army Ordnance Corps; in charge of Clothing Dept., Leicester
Maj. Sidney Ernest Parker, Instructor, Royal Flying Corps
Lt. Robert Halstead Porters, Sec., British Military Mission at Russian Headquarters
Capt. Frederick Charles Prime, Royal Arty., Assistant Inspector of High Explosives, Ministry of Munitions
Capt. Percy Thorndon Remington, Dental Ofc., Australian Army Medical Corps
Capt. William Hoyles Rennie, Volunteer Musketry Instructor, for services in connection with the Royal Newfoundland Reg.
Lt. William Rush, in charge of Stores, No. 2 Reserve Transport Depot, Blackheath
Capt. Percy Rust, London Reg., Artists Rifles Ofc.s Training Corps
Maj. William John Ryan, Royal Flying Corps
Capt. Henry Sadler, Royal Army Service Corps; Riding Master, Buller Barracks, Aldershot
Maj. Thomas Lewis Lindsay Sandes, South African Hospital, Richard Park
Capt. Walter Richard Shilstone, in charge of Canadian and American Inspection Section, Ministry of Munitions
Capt. Sidney James Smith, Royal Army Service Corps; Chief Clerk, Aldershot Command
Brevet Col. Stanley George Drew Smith, Assistant Inspector of Carriages, Ministry of Munitions
Lt. Charles Henry Hughes Spivey, Acting Q.M. and Superintending Clerk of Reserve Battalion, Scots Guards
Lt. Leslie Norman Waldegrave Stone, Royal Garrison Arty.; Assistant Inspector of Carriages, Ministry of Munitions
Capt. Arthur Fraser Sutton, Senior Dental Ofc., Australian Army Medical Corps
Capt. Walter Benjamin Thorpe, Royal Army Service Corps; Chief Superintending Clerk, Northern Command
Capt. Edwin George Thomas Tims, School of Instruction for N.C.O.s, Salisbury
Maj. Walter Henry Tofft, Australian Army Medical Corps
Maj. William Walker, Royal Army Ordnance Dept.
Beatrice Gascoigne Ward, Deputy Commandant, Motor Section, Women's Legion
Capt. William George West, Gun Contracts, Contracts Dept., Ministry of Munitions
Lt. Percy Claydon Whitteridge, Royal Army Ordnance Corps
Maj. Richard Charles Williamson, Recruiting Ofc., Greenock Sub-Area
Capt. George Frederick William Willicot  Staff Ofc., Royal Engineers
Lt. Cecil Herbert Stanley Willis, Artists Rifles Ofc.s Training Corps
Maj. Godfrey Harold Alfred Wilson, General Staff, War Office

For services in connection with the War in France, Egypt and Salonika —
Lt. Andrew Buchan, Royal Engineers
Gladys Mary Collins, Deputy Administrator, Queen Mary's Army Auxiliary Corps
Capt. Francis Robertson Gladstone Duckworth, Sec., Claims Commission, British Salonika Force
Lt. George Ingle Finch, Royal Army Ordnance Corps; Base Ordnance Depot, Salonika
Mary Sophia Frood, Queen Mary's Army Auxiliary Corps, Area Controller, Abbeville
Lilias Ida Gill, Unit Administrator, Queen Mary's Army Auxiliary Corps
Gladys Alicia Jones, Assistant Administrator, Queen Mary's Army Auxiliary Corps
Margaret Kilroy Kenyon, Queen Mary's Army Auxiliary Corps, Area Controller, Calais
Maj. William F. Lench, lately Ofc. in charge of Egyptian Expeditionary Force Canteens
Alice Low, Queen Mary's Army Auxiliary Corps, Area Controller, Boulogne
Frances Mary Parker, Queen Mary's Army Auxiliary Corps, Area Controller, Havre
Edith Mary Pridden, Queen Mary's Army Auxiliary Corps, Area Controller, Étaples

Civil Division 

Ethel May Abram, Commandant, St. Luke's Auxiliary Hospital, Reading
Margaret Acland Hood, Organiser of Recreation Clubs, Munition Workers Welfare Committee, Y.W.C.A.
Maud Florence Addington, Superintendent, Lady Clerical Staff, Ofc.s Casualty Branch, War Office
William James Addiscott, Assistant Collector of Fishery Statistics at Plymouth
Florence Bessie Affleck, Assistant Organiser and Administrator, High Wycombe Auxiliary Hospital
Andrew Aikman, Sec. and Engineering Manager, South-Eastern Midlands Munitions Board of Management
William Aitkenhead, Shop Manager, Messrs. G. & J. Weir, Ltd.
Ernest Charles Aldridge, Travelling Inspector, Central Stores Dept., Ministry of Munitions
Samuel Kendrick Aldridge, Assistant, Director of Finance, Ministry of Food
Stroma Alexander-Sinclair
Charles Hugh Alison, Acting Paymaster, Army Pay Dept.
George Macdonald Allan, Naval Sea Transport Branch, Ministry of Shipping
Ida Allan, Commandant, Hornbrook Auxiliary Hospital, Chislehurst
Thomas Easton Allan, Messrs. Robey & Company, Ltd.
Thomas Cuthbert Allchin, E.G. Powder Company, Ltd.
William Barnes Alloock, Superintendent, Perivale National Filling Factory, Ministry of Munitions
Alan Bruce Allen, Inspector of Furs and Skins, War Office
Frank Allen, Chief Special Constable, Doncaster
Alfred Amos  Chairman of the Kent Farmers Club
Capt. Henry Leonard Herbert Andrews, Ministry of National Service
Malcolm Percival Applebey, Acids Supply Branch of Explosives Supply Dept., Ministry of Munitions
Lt. Alfred Henry Arnold, Sec. to Mediterranean Commission, British Red Cross and Order of St. John of Jerusalem
Florence Evelyn Arnott, Commandant in Charge, St. Michael's Auxiliary Hospital, Brampton, Cumberland
Olive Inana Arthur, Vice-Convenor and General Manager, Red Cross Comforts Depot, Ayr
Lt. Robert William Ascroft, Head of Spraying Organisation, Food Production Dept.
Harry Hales Ashbridge, Works Manager, Churchill Machine Tool Company Limited, Manchester
Ernest Gilman Ashley, Commercial Steel Section, Iron and Steel Dept., Ministry of Munitions
Wilfred Adam Ashworth, Technical Assistant, Machine Tool Dept., Ministry of Munitions
Carleton Richard Bucky Atkinson, Assistant in Levant Consular Service
Sydney Watson Attwell, Assistant, National Phvsical Laboratory
Frances Victoria Aur, Sec., Convalescent Homes for Ofc.s Committee, British Red Cross Society
Stanley Back, Royal Navy, Ordnance Store Depot, Portsmouth
Eustace Vivian Bacon, Assistant, Secretariat, Ministry of Munitions
Francis Baker, Great Western Railway
Percy Montagu Baker, Technical Adviser, Training Section, Labour Supply Dept., Ministry of Munitions
Thomas Edgar Baker, Assistant, Establishment Dept., Ministry of Munitions
William Ernest Baker, Projectile Company, Ltd.
Joseph Alfred William Ballard, Torpedo Store Dept., Admiralty
Victoria Vera Bannatyne, Sec. to the Devon and Cornwall War Refugees Committee
Alexander Bannerman, Head of the Clerical Staff, War Trade Intelligence Dept.
Frances Amy Barber, Ofc. in Charge, Red Cross Hub, 54 General Hospital, France
Samuel Henry Barber, Chief Ofc., Northampton Special Constabulary
William Clarence Barber, Establishment Branch, Trench Warfare Supply Dept., Ministry of Munitions
Thomas Barker, Chairman, Branston Rural Local Tribunal
Maj. Alfred George Barrett, Royal Engineers, Staff Clerk, Contracts Branch, H.M. Office of Works
Herbert Harry Baron, Non-technical Assistant, Machine Tool Dept., Ministry of Munitions
Kenneth Delmar Barrett, Outside Manager, Messrs. Hawthorn, Leslie & Company
William James Barrett, Inspector of Woodwork, Woolwich Dockyard
Lt.-Cmdr. Thomas Barwell Barrington  Design Section, Air Board, Technical Dept.
Jonathan Barron, Fishery Ofc. of the Cornwall Local Sea Fisheries Committee
Olive Bartels, Lady Clerk, War Office
Harriet Barton, Commandant and Superintendent, Auxiliary Hospital, Budleigh Salterton
William Bate, National Explosives Company 
Helen Maud Bax-Ironside, Munition Workers Welfare Committee (Y.W.C.A.) Organiser in Lancaster
Fane Fleming Baxter, War Refugees Committee
Bertha Marguerite Bayne, Chief Woman Inspector, Food Production Dept.
John William Bearder  Headmaster, Northallerton Grammar School; Honorary Sec. of Yorkshire North Riding Local Representative Committee, and of Belgian Refugee Committee
Edith Maude Beaver, Assistant Inspector, National Health Insurance Commission (England)
Herbert Bowman Beddall, Food Production Sub-Comm. for Cornwall
Reginald Bedding ton, Divisional Cmdr., Metropolitan Special Constabulary
James Stuart Beddoe, Dept. of Director of Dockyards and Repairs, Admiralty
Richard William Bedford, Messrs. G. Ken Ltd.
Evelyn Belcher, Q.M., Auxiliary Hospital, Chippenham, Wiltshire
Violet Caroline Bell, Voluntary Aid Detachment, New Zealand Expeditionary Force
Gwendolen Edith Bellasis, Higher Grade Woman Clerk in the War Trade Dept.
Ernest Lampeer Bennett, Sec. in Charge, Yorkshire Division, Y.M.C.A. 
Lt. John Baldwin Beresford, Sec. of the Professional Classes Committee of the Government Committee for the Prevention and Relief of Distress
Alice Eleanor Bernard, Contraband Dept., Foreign Office
Stanley Howard Bersey, Explosives Factory Finance, Finance Dept., Ministry of Munitions
F. H. Bevan, Technical Services Branch, Ministry of Shipping
Lois Biddle, Contraband Dept., Foreign Office
William Henry Bignold, Collector of Customs and Excise, Leith
Thomas Edson Birbeck, Senior Bond Ofc., Manchester, Ministry Of Munitions
Bertha Birch
Tom Birkett, Food Production Sub-Comm. for Cumberland and Westmorland
Capt. Percy Bishop, Assistant Engineer engaged on Design of Aeroplanes at Royal Aircraft Factory
Mancra Winifred Black, Private Sec. to Acting Chief of British War Mission in U.S.A.
Frances Charlotte Isabella Blackett, Honorary Sec. for Perthshire, Scottish Branch, British Red Cross Society
Malcolm Blair, Manager, Messrs. Head, Wrightson & Company
Jack Percy Blake, Head of Priority Section, Explosives Supply Dept., Ministry of Munitions
Thomas Blarney  Bailie of Cowdenbeath
Nesta Blennerhassett, Lord Dunraven's Hospital Ship Grainaig
John William Arundel Bonner, Chairman of Southwell Rural Tribunal
Harold Arthur Box, Second in Charge, Motor Ambulance Dept., Headquarters Staff, British Red Cross Society
Lota Boycott, Commandant, Bricket House Auxiliary Hospital, St. Albans
Elizabeth Frances Boyd, Ministry of National Service
Albert Edward Boyer  Conducting Ofc., Horse Transport Duty
William Embrey Bradbury, London and North Western Railway
Henry Edward Manning Bradley, Staff Clerk, Supplies Division, H.M. Office of Works
Lt. The Hon. Oliver Sylvian Brett, Military Intelligence Branch, War Office
Edith Marian Brightman, Commandant, Fairneld Auxiliary Hospital, Broadstairs
Col. Arthur Rudston Brown, Deputy Director of Recruiting, Birmingham Area
Charles Frederick Brown, Military Sea Transport Branch, Ministry of Shipping
Fannie Florence Brown, Vice-President, Heaton Chapel Division, British Red Cross and Order of St. John of Jerusalem
George Drake Brown
Tomyns Reginald Browne  Inspector of Gun Ammunition (Supervisory), Ministry of Munitions
Bertha Marguerita Bruce, Inspection Welfare Superintendent, Ministry of Munitions, Birmingham
Maye Bruce, Commandant, Norton Hall Auxiliary Hospital, Campden, Gloucestershire
John Locktom Bryan, Superintendent of Registry, Food Production Dept.
Herbert William Bryant, Sec. in Charge, North Midland Division, Y.M.C.A. 
Frederick Francis Smith Bryson, Sub-Section Director, Optical Munitions and Glass Dept., Ministry of Munitions
James Buckman, Chairman, Bermondsey Advisory Committee, Ministry of National Service
Alfred Adolphus Bumpus  Ex-Chairman of Loughborough Local Tribunal
Richard Edward Bumstead  Member of East Kent Appeal Tribunal
Samuel Bunton  Technical Ofc. to Shipyard Labour Dept., Admiralty
Lt. Albert Edmund Burden, Stores Manager, Alexandria and Canal Zone, British Red Cross and Order of St. John
Arthur William Burgess, in charge of Aeronautical Supply Dept. Registry, Air Board
Elspeth Burgess, Chief Q.M., Newbury Auxiliary Hospital, Victoria Park, Manchester
John Laurence Burleigh, Chairman, Colchester Advisory Committee
George Alfred Burling, Private Sec. to Assistant Sec., Establishment Dept., Ministry of Munitions
Regiaulde de Maule Burn-Murdoch, Assistant County Director for City of Edinburgh, Scottish Branch, British Red Cross Society
Helen Jaqueline Burns, Scottish Organiser, Munition Workers Welfare Committee, Y.W.C.A.
Hedley Gravett Burrough, Sec. in Charge, South Eastern Division, Y.M.C.A. 
Leopold Arthur Burrow, Chief Draughtsman to Chief Mechanical Engineer, War Office
Kate Ellen Burrows, Commandant, Voluntary Aid Detachment No. 22, Arnott Hill Auxiliary Hospital, Day brook, Nottinghamshire
John Burt  Member of Appeal Tribunal, Dunfermline
Ethel Cadogan Burton Ballantine, Lady Superintendent, Army Pay Dept.
Isabel Burton-Mackenzie, Welfare Supervisor, Ministry of Munitions, National Projectile Factory, Cardonald, Glasgow
John Edwin Bury, Assistant Director of Finance, Royal Commission on Wheat Supplies
Clement Guy Caines, Accountant-General's Dept., Admiralty
John Cairns  Northumberland Miners Association; Member of Colliery Recruiting Court, Northumberland and North Durham
Norman Restell Cameron, Acting Shipyard Manager, Messrs. Thornycroft and Company
Clementina Henrietta Campbell, Trade Division, of the Naval Staff, Admiralty
Maj. Colin Clyde Campbell, Australian Imperial Force
Gilbert Campbell, Outside Manager, Wallsend Slipway and Engineering Company
Harry Campbell, Transport Superintendent o the War Refugees Committee
James Alexander West Campbell, Acting Accountant in the War Office
Capt. Thomas Epton Campey, Army Veterinary Stores Dept.
Henry Candler, Acting Staff Clerk, War Office
William Carnegie, Messrs. Cammell Laird & Company, Ltd.
Thomas William Carroll, Constructive Dept., H.M. Dockyard, Portsmouth
Francis Tavor Carter, Sec., London Central Association, Y.M.C.A.
William Carter, Clerk to the Horwich Urban District Council
Albert Wing Carver, Clerk to the Cannock Rural Local Tribunal
Francis Richard Cassidi  Ofc. in Charge, Transport of First Line Hospitals, Derbyshire
The Hon. Alicia Margaret Cecil, Assistant Director of Horticultural Organisation, Food Production Dept.
Thomas Chadwick, Minor Staff Clerk, Treasury
Alfred Philip Chalkley, Chief Engineer, Motor Boat Service, Mesopotamia, British Red Cross Society
Bromley Challenor, Clerk to the Guardians, Abingdon
William Robert Challinor, Inspector, Wigan Special Constabulary
Margaret Chalmers, Administrative Assistant, Materials and Accessories Branch, Air Board
Harry Chambers, Chief Assistant, Seeds Section, Food Production Dept.
Guy Mortimer Chantrey, Trench Warfare Finance, Finance Dept., Ministry of Munitions
Harry Cheesman, Chairman of Advisory Committee, Lewisham
Mary Alden Childers, Sec. of the Chelsea War Refugees Committee
Elizabeth Chinery, Commandant, Home Mead Auxiliary Hospital, Lymington
Owen Aly Clark  Chief Ofc., Special Constabulary, Bury St. Edmunds
Walter Leonard Clarke, Messrs. Benham & Sons, Ltd.
Edith Clarke, Teacher of Domestic Subjects, National Training School of Cookery
Thomas Henry Clarke, Mechanical Transport, Contracts Dept., Ministry of Munitions
Charles Henry James Clayton, Chief Drainage Inspector, Food Production Dept.
Margaret Penelope Clegg, Commandant of Holden House Auxiliary Hospital, Boston, Lincolnshire
Edith Emily Clowes, Honorary Sec., County of Herefordshire, British Red Cross and Order of St. John of Jerusalem
Alfred William Ayers-Cluett, Royal Corps of Naval Constructors
Ernest Frederick Coast, Royal Corps of Naval Constructors
Robert Bennett Cobb, First Class Clerk, Ministry of Pensions
Lady Gertrude Cochrane, President of the Fifeshire Branch, Scottish Branch, British Red Cross Society
Edward Cock, Royal Corps of Naval Constructors
Douglas Bennett Cockerell, Stores Accounting Ofc., Ministry of Munitions
Frank William Coffey, Sec. in Charge, Midland Division, Y.M.C.A. 
Edward George Cole  Chairman of the Edmonton Military Hospital Committee
Harold William Cole, Chief Clerk, Petrol Dept., Board of Trade
Capt. Francis William Colledge, Honorary Sec. and Acting County Director, Renfrewshire, Scottish Branch, British Red Cross Society
Lionel Dennis Collins, Collector of Fishery Statistics in North Shields
Beatrice Annie Collinson, Commandant in Charge, Auxiliary Hospital, Stramongate, Westmorland
Walter William Coltman  Chief Ofc., Loughborough Special Constabulary
Charles Leonard Compton, Senior Staff Clerk in the Registry-General of Shipping and Seamen
Geraldine Emily Coningham, Oakhurst Auxiliary Hospital, Erith
Jessie Murdoch Connell, Commandant of Myrtle Auxiliary Hospital, Myrtle Street, Liverpool
James Conner, Messrs. Dick Kerr, Ltd.
Fred Compigne Cook, Chief Aliens Ofc., Port of London
Richard Frederic Cook, Section Director, Railway Materials Branch, Ministry of Munitions
Cuthbert Cresswell Cooke, Projectile Contracts, Contracts Dept., Ministry of Munitions
Henry James Cooksey, Class A Clerk, War Office
Arthur Henry Coombe, Accountant-General's Dept., Admiralty
William Walter Coombs, Staff Clerk, Companies Dept., Board of Trade
Bertram George Cooper, Head of Sub-section of Air Board Technical Dept.
Lt. H. M. Cooper, Assistant Inspector of Munitions, Canada
James Cooper, Class A Clerk, War Office
John Cooper, President of the North Staffordshire Miners Association; Assessor to the Colliery Recruiting Court
Clarence George Copus, Head of the Oiler Section, Ministry of Shipping
Maj. Edward Richard Trevor Corbett, District Recruiting Ofc., No. 4 District
Hilda Eliza Agar Cordeaux, Commandant, Auxiliary Hospital, Louth, Lincolnshire
John Corrigan, Member of Appeal Tribunal, Ayr
Howard Denys Russell Cowan, British Vice-Consul, Havana
William Cowan, Works Manager, Messrs. Palmer's Jarrow Shipyard
Randolph Lewis Coward, First Class Assistant Accountant in the War Office
Juliet Sisley Craig, Commandant of the Hillingdon Auxiliary Hospital, Hayes End, Middlesex
James Crawley, Stores Dept., Headquarters Staff, British Red Cross Society
Edward Patrick Creegan, Superintendent of the Drawing Dept. of the Ordnance Survey of the United Kingdom
Gerald Faulkner Cripps, Sec. of the Committee for Providing Hostels for Disabled Men under Training
Helena Jane Crisp, Voluntary Aid Detachment Dept., British Red Cross Society
Herbert Lawson Critchley, Sub-Section Director in Charge, Efficiency Section, Gun Ammunition Manufacture, Ministry of Munitions
William Gordon Crockett, Junior Clerk, Stores Dept., India Office
George Scott Cromar, Sr., Outside Manager of Messrs. D. & W. Henderson & Company
Winifred Eyre Crompton-Roberts, Honorary Sec., Auxiliary Hospital, Monmouth
Ann Ellen Cropper, Commandant, Auxiliary Hospital, Portskewitt, Monmouthshire
Ernest Cross, Staff Ofc., Rotherham Special Constabulary
Robert Cross, Station Master, Midland Railway, Tilbury
William Cuickshank, Assistant Inspector of Carriages, Ministry of Munitions
Janet Baron Cumming, Organising Sec. in Scotland, Munition Workers Welfare Committee, Y.W.C.A.
Margaret Georgiana Cuninghame, Honorary Sec. and Superintendent of Ayrshire Surgical Work Depot
Marghuerita Copeland Currie, Canteen Inspector, Munition Workers Welfare Committee, Y.W.C.A.
George Charles Cusens, Torpedo Store Dept., Admiralty
John Cuthberfeson, Ernest Edward Cutler, Messrs. Cutler & Sons
James Daglish, Outside Manager of North-Eastern Marine Engineering Company, Ltd.
Ellen Frances Darlow, Commandant of Auxiliary Hospital, Presbyterian Hall, Northwood, Middlesex
William Elliot Darrach, Technical Services Branch, Ministry of Shipping
Grace Emilie Davey, in charge of Women Staff, Labour Dept., Ministry of Munitions
George Frederick Davidson, Personal Assistant to Council Member G, Ministry of Munitions
Sophia Katherine Davies, Welfare Supervisor, Ministry of Munitions, National Projectile Factory, Templeboro
Alfred Thomas Davies, Assistant, Priority Dept., Ministry of Munitions
Arthur Vernon Davies  Assistant County Director Representing; the Order of St. John of Jerusalem, East Lancashire
Gwilym Meirion Davies, Sec., Ministry of Munitions District Office, No. 2 Area (North-West England)
Hugh Christopher Davies, Sec., Norfolk War Agricultural Executive Committee
Walter Davies, Sec. to the Local Representative Committee for Baling
Thomas Daw, Assistant Director of Recruiting, Central London Area
Horace Christian Dawkins, Divisional Cmdr., Metropolitan Special Constabulary
George William Dawson, Private Sec. to Acting Member of Council A, Ministry of Munitions
Beatrice Mary Dawson-Thomas, Commandant, Auxiliary Hospital, Old Baux Buildings, Minehead
George Day, Naval Store Dept., Admiralty
Edgar Reginald Deacon, Research Dept., Woolwich Arsenal
Frederic William Charles Dean, Manager, Gun and Carriage Factories, Woolwich Arsenal
Seth Ellis Dean, Chairman, Sleaford Rural Tribunal
Phyllis Lucy Deane, Commandant, Sandy Auxiliary Hospital; Bedford
Albert Deighton, Chief Engineer and Works Manager, Messrs. Steel, Peech, and Tozer, Ltd.
Adam Fairrie Denniston, Supervisor for the Eastern District of Scotland Red Cross Depot
Hubert Augutus Dent, In charge of Issue of Drafts, Finance Dept., Ministry of Munitions
Lady Lilian Mary Harriet Diana Digby, Commandant, Voluntary Aid Detachment No. 94; Donor, Holnest Auxiliary Hospital, Sherborne
Charles William Dixon, Second Class Clerk, Colonial Office; Private Sec. to the Permanent UnderSec. of State
Annie Emilia Scott Elliott Doig, Lady Superintendent, All Welcome Y.M.C.A. Hut, Victoria
William Donald, Assistant Manager for Submarines, Messrs. Vickers, Ltd.
William John Dorrell, Assistant to Head of Shipping Intelligence Section, Ministry of Shipping
Aileen Margaret Dougherty, Foreign Claims Office
Allie Vibert Douglas, Statistical Dept., Ministry of National Service
Percy Bissett Down, Assistant Inspector of Guns, Ministry of Munitions
John Drake, Assistant Superintendent of Registry, Treasury
Sidney William Drinkwater, Second Division Clerk, Home Office
Edith Marion Drummond Smith, Organiser of Munition Workers Hute, Munition Workers Welfare Committee, Y.W.C.A.
Duncan Drysdale, Finance Branch, Ministry of Shipping
Bernard Phineas Dudding, Assistant, National Physical Laboratory
Reginald Franklin Hare Duke, General Sec. to the Commission Internationale de Ravitaillement, Board of Trade
Frank Hay Dunbar, Head of the Registry of the Restriction of Enemy Supplies Dept.
James Dunley, Member of Appeal Tribunal, Alloa
Frederick George Dunlop, Outside Manager of Messrs. Harland & Wolff's Belfast Works
William Louis Martial Dunlop, Staff Clerk, Foreign Office
Mabel Alethea Dupe, Lady Superintendent, Y.M.C.A. Shakespeare Hut, Gower Street
Frederick Harold Dupre  Official Chemical Adviser on Explosives to the Home Office and Ministry of Munitions
William Duran  Honorary Sheriff Substitute of Caithness, Orkney, and Shetland; Member of Appeal Tribunal, Caithness
Beatrice Aimee Dutton, Commandant, Auxiliary Hospital, Windlesham Moor, Windlesham, Surrey
Harold George Eadie, Sec., Ministry of Munitions District Office, No. 4 Area (Midlands)
Edward Herbert Eagar, Senior Examiner, Pay Office
Herbert Eborall, Accountant-General's Dept., Admiralty
Stuart Strickland Moore Ede, Sub-section Director, Raw Materials Branch, Ministry of Munitions
John Francis Edmonds, Superintendent, London Telephone Service
Edith Constance Edwards, Commandant, Voluntary Aid Detachment No. 272, County of London; Organiser of Flag Day Collections in Marylebone
Edward Tregaskiss Elbourne, Shop Superintendent, Ponders End Shell Works, Ponders End, Middlesex
Archibald Sefton Elford, Ministry of Shipping
Mabel Beatrice Elliott, Assistant Censor, War Office
William Elliott, Outside Shipyard Manager of Messrs. J. L. Thompson & Sons
Amy Amelia Ellis, Commandant, St. Aidan's Auxiliary Hospital, Cleethorpes
Frank Ellison, Messrs. Hadfields, Ltd.
Horace Milton Emery, Technical Adviser, Mechanical Cultivation Division, Food Production Dept.
George Ernest Emmett, Acting Paymaster, Army Pay Dept.
Frederick George Eshelby, Head of Military Traffic Dept., North-Eastern Railway
George Gall Esslemont, Executive Officoer for Food Production, County of Aberdeen; Organiser of Egg Collection in the North Eastern District, Scottish Branch, British Red Cross Society
Harriet Estill, Lady Superintendent and Hon. Sec., Highfield Auxiliary Hospital, Malton, Yorkshire
Christopher Douglas Evans, Superintendent, Remount Depot, Ballsbridge
Edward Percy Everest, Clerk to the Atcham Rural District Council
James Alfred Fage, Dept. of Director of Dockyards and Repairs
Robert Faikney, Dept.al Manager of the Dock Dept., Fanfield Shipbuilding and Engineering Company
Marie-Antoinette Fairholme, Commandant, Auxiliary Hospital, Hathersage, Derbyshire
James Falconer
Samuel Maddams Fane, Staff Clerk, Supplies Division, H.M. Office of Works
Edwin Wood Thorp Farley  Mayor of Dover; Chairman of the Dover Local Tribunal
Alexander Farquharson, Assistant in Local Authorities Division, Ministry of Food
Capt. William Scott Farren, in charge of Aero-Dynamics at Royal Aircraft Factory
Edith M. Feast, Honorary Sec. to Kobe British Ladies Patriotic League
Katherine Fedden, Chairman, Belgravia War Hospital Supply Depot
Alfred Ernest Fellowes, Forwarding Agent, Ministry of Munitions, Liverpool
Charles Ernest Fenton, Staff Ofc., Post Office Stores Dept.
Harriet Frances Fenwick, Lady Superintendent, Army Pay Dept.
Florence Fetherstonhaugh, Vice-President and Organiser, Hazelwood Auxiliary Hospital, Ryde, Isle of Wight
Elizabeth Susan Findlay, Superintendent of Women Munition Workers Canteen, Crayford
Georgina Julia Findlay-Hamilton
David John Finlayson, Chief Accountant, Headquarters Staff, British Red Cross Society
Benjamin Kingston Finnimore, Assistant County Director, Dorsetshire, and Hon. Sec. for Sherborne Division, British Red Cross Society
Clare Jane Firth, Matron, Withington Military Hospital
Honoria Mary Fisher, Commandant, Waltham Town Hall Auxiliary Hospital, Waltham Abbey
Henry FitzMaurice, First Class Assistant in Siam Consular Service
Basil Fletcher, Acting Professional Clerk, Dept. of the Director of Public Prosecutions
Watson Foggo, Manager, Cartridge Filling Factory, Aintree, Ministry of Munitions
Robert Charles Follett, Adjutant, Hull Special Constabulary
Mary Constance Forbes, Honorary Sec. of Red Cross Work Parties in the City of Edinburgh
John Ford, Works Manager, Parsons Marine Steam Turbine Company
William Robinson Lidderdale Forrest, Senior Bond Ofc., Birmingham, Ministry of Munitions
Andrew Forster, Works Manager, Engine Side, Messrs. J. S. White & Company 
John Forster  Ex-Mayor of St. Helens; Chairman of St. Helens Local Tribunal
Frederick Walter Fossey, Senior Bond Ofc., Newcastle, Ministry of Munitions
Henry Knollys Foster, Sec. and Executive Ofc., Herefordshire War Agricultural Executive Committee
William Melville Foster, in charge, Censored Cables, Ministry of Munitions
Edward Turner Fowell, Explosives Contracts Finance, Finance Dept., Ministry of Munitions
Helene Fowle, President of the Committee for Dealing with the Interests of Belgians in Ireland
Eveline Georgina Fowler, Founder and Manager of the Gunton Cottage Hospital for Naval Cases, Lowestoft
John Jacob Fox  First Class Analyst, Government Laboratory
Evelyn Margaret Fraser
Thomas Houston Fraser, Contractors Claims for Increased Prices, Contracts Dept., Ministry of Munitions
Edward James Frewen, Section Director, Railway Materials Branch, Ministry of Munitions
Elizabeth Rowley Frisby, Y.M.C.A. Worker
William Percy Froud, Superintendent to the Joint Railway Lines, Portsmouth
Dorothy Margaret Fry, Private Sec. to Director-General of Munitions Supply, Ministry of Munitions
Walter Everard Fuller, Superintendent, Contraband Dept. Registry
Mary Edith Galilee, Superintendent of Women Munition, Workers Canteen, Hayes
Christian McDowall Gall, Private Sec. to Additional Member of Council R., Ministry of Munitions
John Dunn Gamble, British and Foreign Sailors Society, Derry
Henry John Edward Garcia, Inspector of Taxes, Inland Revenue
Albert Gard, Clerk to the Guardians, Devonport; Sec. to the Plymouth Prince of Wales Fund Committee
Nora Hilton Gardner, Q.M., Hoole Bank Auxiliary Hospital, Cheshire
Caroline Sugden Garnett, Commandant, Fairhope Auxiliary Hospital, Pendleton, Manchester
Helen Maude Dorothy Garnett, Organiser of Women Munition Workers, Canteens and Clubs, Y.W.C.A.
Constance Elizabeth Garside, Superintendent of Women Munition Workers Canteen and Social Work, Dursley
Reginald Genower, Assistant in Statistical Branch, Ministry of Food
William Geoghegan, County Director, City of Dublin, British Red Cross and Order of St. John of Jerusalem
Allan Gibb, Rifle and Machine Gun Contracts, Contracts Dept., Ministry of Munitions
Herbert Mends Gibson, Chairman of Transport Committee, East Lancashire, British Red Cross Society
William Howieson Gibson, Research Dept., Woolwich Arsenal
William Charles Ernest Gibson, Divisional Cmdr., Metropolitan Special Constabulary
Thomas Arthur Walter Giffard, Military Intelligence Branch, War Office
George Julian Gilbert, Staff Clerk, Civil Liabilities Committee
Violet Adeline Gilbert, Personal Clerk to the President of the Board of Agriculture
Robert Giles, Assistant Yard Manager, Messrs. Sir W. G. Armstrong, Whitworth & Company, Ltd.
James Searle Gillingham, Royal Corps of Naval Constructors
Maud Glennie, Late Private Sec. to Assistant Financial Sec., Ministry of Munitions
Patrick Gordon Glennie, Ministry of Shipping
James William Sleigh Godding  Chairman, Plymouth Advisory Committee
Albert Hamilton Godfrey, Chairman, Woking Local Tribunal
Fanny Augusta Going, Lady Superintendent, Auxiliary Hospital, Littlehampton
Edward Goldsmith, Divisional Cmdr., Metropolitan Special Constabulary
Alfred Gollin, Divisional Cmdr., Metropolitan Special Constabulary
Herbert Gooch, Confidential Clerk to Q.M. General, War Office
Stanley Vernon Goodall, Royal Corps of Naval Constructors
Alwyn Valerie Goodchild, Voluntary Aid Detachment, New Zealand Expeditionary Force
Joshua Goodland, Assistant, Classification Section, Priority Dept., Ministry of Munitions
Walter Goodwin, Assistant (Hospitals) Architect, War Office
Helen Goodyear, Administrative Assistant, Contracts Branch, Air Board
Percy Goodyear, Royal Corps of Naval Constructors
George Gordon, Expense Accounts Dept., H.M. Dockyard, Devonport
Robert Gordon, Mobilization Division, Admiralty Naval Staff
Lily Gordon-Steward, Commandant, Voluntary Aid Detachment No. 26, St. John's Hospital, Weymouth
Capt. Gorman Gorman
Sandford George Gorton, Assistant Cable Engineer, General Post Office
John Henry Gorvin, Assistant Sec., Royal Commission on Wheat Supplies
John Benjamin Gotts, Superintendent of Manchester Branch, H.M. Stationery Office
Claude William Shepard Gould, Assistant Commandant, Auxiliary Hospital, Barnstaple
Robert Vaughan Gower, Mayor of Tunbridge Wells
Christopher Colborne Graham, Mayor of Scarborough; Chairman of Local Tribunal
Lt. Cuthbert Graham, Royal Engineers, Trench Warfare Research Dept., Ministry of Munitions
David Morgan Graham 
Lt.-Col. William Grant, American Remount Commission
Reginald Coupland Graves, Clerk to the Tottenham Urban District Council; Clerk to the Local Tribunal and Local Representative Committee
Charles Harold Gray, Acting Paymaster, Army Pay Dept.
William Gray, British Vice-Consul at Oruro, Bolivia
Constance Mary Greaves, Donor and Matron, Wern Auxiliary Hospital, Portmadoc
Alexander John Green, Sec.-in-Charge, London Division, Y.M.C.A. 
Hettie Mary Green, Honorary Sec., General Service Section, and Organiser, Nottinghamshire, British Red Cross and Order of St. John of Jerusalem
Edith Mary Greenfield, Superintendent of Women Munition Workers Club, Newcastle
Capt. Cecil Anstey Greet, Instructor in Catering, War Office
Alvero Church Gregson, In Charge of Checking Dept., American Branch, Ministry of Munitions
Capt. Robert Holmes Arbuthnot Gresson, Adjutant, Remount Service
Charles William Grey, Surveyor (temporary), War Office
James Dyce Grieve, Staff Clerk, Board of Agriculture for Scotland
The Reverend Ellis Hughes Griffith, Chairman of Aethewy (Anglesey) Local Tribunal
Helen Maud Griffiths
James Thomas Grimbly, Senior Clerk, Recruiting Dept., Ministry of National Service
Henry Grimsdall, Transport Ofc., Middlesex, British Red Cross and Order of St. John of Jerusalem
Ellen Maud Grimsley, Sec. to the County Director, British Red Cross and Order of St. John of Jerusalem, Leicestershire
John Gritton, Staff Clerk, Foreign Office
Susannah Groom, Commandant of Allan House Auxiliary Hospital, Boston, Lincolnshire
Professor Percy Groom  Head of Section of Technical Dept. of Air Board
Maj. John James Grubb, Q.M. General's Dept., War Office
Allan Wilson Grundy, Naval Store Dept., H.M. Dockyard, Portsmouth
Charles John Tench Bedford Grylls, Committee Clerk, Customs and Excise
Matilda Ida Gubbins, Organiser and Commandant, High Wycombe Auxiliary Hospital
Capt. Philip Edward Gummer, Royal Engineers, Staff Ofc., Royal Engineers, Irish Command
Olive Francis Guthrie-Smith, Head Masseuse, Almeric Paget Military Massage Corps
Frederick Weston Hadden, Private Sec. to the Financial Sec. of the Admiralty
William Hadnutt, Instructional Manager, Training Section; Labour Supply Dept., Ministry of Munitions
Bernard Parker Haigh  Instructor in Applied Mechanics, Royal Naval College, Greenwich
Harry Francis Hall, Technical Assistant, First Class, H.M. Office of Works
John Hall 
John William Halloran, Town Clerk, Chatham; Clerk to the Chatham Local Tribunal
Emily Moore Hamilton, Controller of Welfare and Chief Superintendent of Girl Messengers, War Office
William Cecil Hammond, Divisional Cmdr., Metropolitan Special Constabulary
George Hankinson, Clerk to the Guardians, Bridlington; Clerk to the Local Representative Committee
Maj. Arthur Leonard Hanna, Inspecting Ofc.-to Mechanical Transport, Ministry of Munitions1
Clarence Oldham Hanson, Assistant Deputy Surveyor, Forest of Dean
Second Lt. Peter Kydd Hanton, Royal Engineers, Assistant Architect, 2nd Class, H.M. Office of Works
James Hardman, Assistant Architect, War Office
Frank Philip Hardy, Travelling Inspector, Central Stores Dept., Ministry of Munitions
Maj. George Samuel Harries, Chairman, Swansea Advisory Committee
Ethel Harris, Superintendent of Women Munition Workers Clubs, Erith and Carlisle
Capt. Samuel Wallace Harris, Q.M., Headquarters, Irish Command
William Thomas Hooper Harris, Chief Examiner, War Office
George Hart-Cox, Munitions Stores Ofc., Woolwich Arsenal
Maj. Edward John Morewood Harvey, Assistant Inspector of Small Arms, Ministry of Munitions
Cmdr. Edwin William Harvey, Royal Naval Reserve, Dock Master, Southampton, London and South-Western Railway
Capt. Nicholas Charles Harvey, Q.M., Headquarters, Northern Command
William Harvey, Chief Inspector, Stockport Special Constabulary
Charles Frederick Harvie, Supervising Clerk, War Office
James Henry Harwood, Travelling Inspector, Central Stores Dept., Ministry of Munitions
Arthur Haskins, Works Manager, Messrs. Hoffman Manufacturing Company Limited, Chelmsford
Capt. Thomas Wilfred Haslam, Deputy Assistant Director of Railway Transport, Australian Imperial Force
Peter Hastie, Shipyard Manager, Messrs. J. S. White & Company
Robert Haswell, Sec., Messrs. W. Doxford & Sons
Albert Victor Hawkins, Chief Inspector, Metropolitan Police
Thomas Shirley Hawkins, Director of Works Dept., Admiralty
Henrietta Louisa Hay, Organiser of Canteens in London Area, Munition Workers Welfare Committee, Y.W.C.A.
Arthur W. Hayes, Sec.-in-Charge, East Kent Division, Y.M.C.A. 
Fredric James Hayes, Honorary Sec.-in-Charge, Lancashire Division, Y.M.C.A. 
Robert Hollbwell Headley, Staff Clerk, Military Dept., India Office
Arthur William Heasman Assistant Architect, 2nd Class, H.M. Office of Works
Maj. Herbert Charles Selwyn Heath, Deputy Assistant Inspector of Recruiting, Northern Command
Florence Agnes Hebb, Chief Superintendent of Typists in Aeronautical Supply Dept., Air Board
Alice Craig Henderson, Lady Superintendent, Knighton Auxiliary Hospital, Evington, Leicester
George Blake Henderson, Works Manager on the Engineering Side, Messrs. Thornycroft & Company
Jane Selina Henry
John Henry, Private Sec. to the Sec. of the War Trade Dept.
Agnes Mary Herbert, Voluntary Aid Detachment, New Zealand Expeditionary Force
John Tordiffe Hewetson, Late Deputy Cashier in Charge, Royal Navy Torpedo Factory, Greenock
James Baylis Heynes, British Vice-Consul at Messina
Henry George Hibberd, Ordnance Store Dept., Admiralty
Frank Sidney Higman, Y.M.C.A. Sec. for Wales
Elizabeth Annie Higson
Arthur James Hill, Assistant, Establishment Dept., Ministry of Munitions
Capt. Henry Hincks, Ministry of National Service
William Edwin Hincks  Chairman of Leicester War Pensions Committee and Representative of the Ministry of Pensions, East Midlands
Arthur Sidney Hines, Assistant, Staff Records and Premises, Labour Dept., Ministry of Munitions
Violet Verve Hobart, Donor and Administrator, West Cliff Hall Auxiliary Hospital, Hythe
William Stanley Hocking, Actuarial Clerk, War Trade Statistical Dept.
Arthur Hogan, Chief Examiner, Exchequer and Audit Dept.
Maj. George Justice Hogben, Auditor, Australian Imperial Force
Lt. George Vincent Hoile, Royal Arty., Ordnance Dept., War Office
Frank Holgate-Smith, Divisional Commandant, Kent Voluntary Aid Detachment, Superintendent of the St. John Ambulance Brigade, Canterbury
Edith Clara Holland, Commandant, Cheadle House Auxiliary Hospital, Cheadle
Frank Herbert Holloway, Assistant Superintending Engineer, Ministry of Munitions, No. 2 Area (North-West England)
Annie Gertrude Holmes, Organiser of Naval Hospital, Hull
Charles Stuart Hooper, Cashier the Finance Branch, Ministry of Shipping
Charles Nugent Hope-Wallace, Ministry of Shipping
Harry Sinclair Hopkins, Senior Bond Ofc., St. Helens, Ministry of Munitions
Sydney Hopping, Acting Chief Examiner, Exchequer and Audit Dept.
Walter Hopps, Commercial Steel Section, Iron and Steel Dept., Ministry of Munitions
Florence Julia Horden, Commandant, Bryn Glas Auxiliary Hospital, Newport, Monmouthshire
Andrew Coutts Home  Shipping Agent, Queenstown
Lt. Henry Spence Home, in charge, Registry, Whitehall Place, Ministry of Munitions
John Laurence Hornibrook, Workman's Compensation Claims Finance Dept., Ministry of Munitions
E. F. Houghton, in charge of Drawing Office, American Branch, Ministry of Munitions
Maj. Alexander McLean Houston, Assistant to Ofc. in Charge of Canadian Records
Arthur Henry Howard, Assistant, Legal Section, Priority Dept., Ministry of Munitions
Carter William Howard, Deputy Superintendent of Printing, H.M. Stationery Office
Holly Howard, Honorary Sec., Special and General Service Dept., East Lancashire, British Red Cross and Order of St. John of Jerusalem
Maj. Alfred Harry Huddart, Inspecting Ofc. to Mechanical Transport, Ministry of Munitions
Llewelyn Hugh-Jones, Honorary Representative of the Ministry of Pensions, North Wales
Edward Hughes  Ex-Mayor of Wrexham; Member of Wrexham Local Tribunal and of East Denbighshire Appeal Tribunal
Helen Cornelia Huleatt, Ofc. in Charge, Hoole Bank and Hoole House Auxiliary Hospitals, Cheshire; Sec., Chester City Division, British Red Cross and Order of St. John of Jerusalem
Edith Louisa Sophia Humphreys, Sec. to Surveyor-General of Supplies, War Office
Harold Goundrill Humphreys, Sub-Section Director, Inland Transport, Ministry of Munitions
Charles Henry Hunt, Clerk in Charge of Accounts, Treasury Solicitor's Dept.
Joseph Henry Hunt, Superintendent, Supply Reserve Depot, Cattle Market, Deptford
William Wright Hunt  Chairman, Woodbridge Local Tribunal
Capt. John Leslie Hunter, Head of Horse Supply Section, Food Production Dept.
Marion Janet Hunter, Honorary Sec. to the Voluntary Aid Detachment Central Selection Board for Scotland
Thomas Briggs Hunter, Civil Engineer, H.M. Dockyard, Rosyth
Wilfred Leavold Hutchinson, Inspector, Small Arms Ammunition Dept., Ministry of Munitions
Lt. Alfred Hutt, Sub-Section Director, Raw Materials Branch, Ministry of Munitions
John Hutt, Ordnance Store Dept., Woolwich
William Ross Hutton, Shipyard Manager, Messrs. R. & W. Hawthorn, Leslie & Company, Ltd.
Arthur Frederick Ilsley, Assistant Sec. of the Iron and Steel Committee and Sec. of the Engineering Committee
Frank Impey, Superintendence and Co-ordination of Brass Rod for Ministry of Munitions in Birmingham
Kate Inglis, Assistant Superintendent and Sec., Princess Louise Convalescent Home for Nursing Sisters, France
Blanche Ireland, Deputy Unit Administrator, Woman's Army Auxiliary Corps
Lt. William Henry Martin Ives, Offices of the War Cabinet
James Robertson Jack, Works Manager, Messrs. Denny Bros
Alice Mabel Erskine Jackson
Arthur Jackson, Trench Warfare Contracts, Contracts Dept., Ministry of Munitions
Capt. Hugh Willan Jackson, Commandant, Wellingborough Special Constabulary
Joseph Clough Jackson, Honorary Sec. of the Belgian Refugees Committee, Leeds
James Picton James, Private Sec. to Controller, Raw Materials Branch, Ministry of Munitions
Thomas Gwynfab James, Director of Elementary Education for the County of Monmouthshire
William Arthur James, in charge, Compilation of Technical Costs, Contracts Dept., Ministry of Munitions
Alexander Jamieson, Provost of Darvel; Member of Appeal Tribunal
Charles Fleming Jamieson, Works Manager of Royal Albert Dock Branch of Messrs. R. & H. Green & Silley Weir Ltd.
Lt. T. S. W. Jarvis, Interpreter to British Military Section in Russia, Ministry of Munitions
Charles Nicholas Theodore Jeffreys, Chief Clerk, Brighton Special Constabulary
Lt.-Cmdr. Charles Frewen Jenkin  Air Board Technical Dept.
Albert David Jenkins, Town Clerk of Guildford; Clerk to Guildford Local Tribunal, Belgian Refugee Committee, and Local Representative Committee
Garnett Longsdon Jerrard, Archivist to His Britannic Majesty's Legation in Switzerland
Frank Ashton Jewell  Mayor of Barnstaple; Chairman of Barnstaple Local Tribunal
Capt. Herbert Cecil Joel, in charge of Army Ordnance Depot, Gloucester Docks
Frederick William Johnson, Manager, Southwark Filling Factory, Ministry of Munitions
Samuel Johnson, Principal Clerk, Stamps and Stores, Inland Revenue
William Johnson  Warwickshire Miners Association, Member of Colliery Recruiting Court, Warwickshire
John Jolly, Victualling Dept., Admiralty
Edmund Vaughan Jones, Principal Assistant to Shipyard Manager, Messrs. Cammell Laird and Company, Ltd.
George Jones, Special Constable attached to Chief Constable's Office, Portsmouth
Harold Spencer Jones, Assistant Inspector of Optical Stores, Ministry of Munitions
James Stuart Jones Inspector of Telegraph and Telephone Traffic, General Post Office
Walter Owen Jones, Clerk to the Anglesey County Council; Clerk to Appeal Tribunal; Sec., Anglesey War Agricultural Executive Committee
Capt. Cerdric Batson Joyner, Protected Badges and Occupations, Labour Supply Dept., Ministry of Munitions
Charles Ernest William Justice, Military Sea Transport Branch, Ministry of Shipping
Sydney Entwisle Kay, British Vice-Consul, Stockholm
Arthur Richard Kearney, Chief Technical Adviser, Technical Organisation of Instructional Factories, Ministry of Munitions
Margaret Alice Keary, Assistant Q.M., Auxiliary Hospital, Torquay
Annie Margaret Keeble Smith, Welfare Superintendent, The Aston Construction Company, Ltd., London
Frank Arthur Kelly, Senior Clerk, Metropolitan Asylums Board
James Kelly, in charge, Price List of Munitions, Contracts Dept., Ministry of Munitions
Robert Kelly, General Outside Manager, Engine Dept., Messrs. Alexander Stephen & Sons
John Howard Kemp Welch, Messrs. Peter Brotherhood Limited
William James Kenny, Civilian Clerk, Army Ordnance Dept.
Helen Bethea Ker, Vice-President, Dumbartonshire Branch; of the Scottish Branch, British Red Cross Society
Gladys Louise Kidd, Clerk in Charge of Copying Room, Treasury
Arthur Frederic Kidson, Town Clerk, Folkestone; Clerk to the Folkestone Local Tribunal
Flight Lt. Leon Joseph Killmayer, Royal Navy, Production Ofc., Seaplanes Branch, Air Board
Norah King, Commandant, Voluntary Aid Detachment No. 26, Willingham Auxiliary Hospital, Cambridgeshire
Henry Smails King, Acting Accountant in the War Office
Mabel Cecil Kirk, Superintendent of Station Hut for Women Munition Workers, Coventry
Richard Cameron Kirkwood, The Yorkshire Boiler Company Ltd.
Wilfrid Robert Klitz, Agent for Furs and Skins, War Office
Frank Knight, Second Class Clerk, Prison Commission
George Knight, Photographer, The Central News Agency
George Stodart Knocker, Assistant Engineer, Ministry of Munitions, No. 4 Area (Midlands)
Edwin Lack, Assistant Staff Engineer, General Post Office
Andrew Lamb, Great Northern Railway (Declined honour.)
Brydon Lamb, Military Service (Civil Liabilities) Committee
Dorothy Lamb, Ministry of National Service
Helena Jane Landells, First Class Clerk, General Post Office, attached to War Office
Harry Joseph Lane, Director, Messrs. J. J. Lane, Limited, London
George Langlands, Outdoor Manager, Dock Dept., Engine Side, Messrs. Beardmore & Company
Alfred Tabods Larter, Aeronautics Contracts, Contracts Dept., Ministry of Munitions
Ernest Lingwood Lawes, Senior Ofc., Southend-on-Sea Special Constabulary
Aubrey Trevor Lawrence, Sec. to the Central Stores Dept., Ministry of Munitions
Ernest Laws, Clerk, Local Government Board
Maud Matilda Layton, Head Masseuse, Almeric Paget Military Massage Corps
William Leek, Inspector of Metalliferous Mines
Arthur Leggett, Works Manager, Messrs. E. R. and F. Turner, Ipswich
Lt. George Legh-Jones, Naval Sea Transport Branch, Ministry of Shipping
Louis Levi, Manager of Trench Warfare Dept. Watford Filling Factory, Ministry of Munitions
Janet Marion Terry Lewis, Lady Superintendent, Ministry of Labour [formerly Office Sec'y Gramophone Co., 1897-1900].
Jessie Liddiard, Superintendent of Women Clerks, Ministry of Pensions
Edgar William Light, Treaty Dept., Foreign Office
Henry Lightbody  Honorary Sec., Y.M.C.A. in Scotland
Charles Swift Lillicrap, Royal Corps of Naval Constructors
Frederic Caesar Linfield  Assistant, Munitions Inventions Dept.
Agnes Evelyn Linnell, Commandant, Auxiliary Hospital, Sheringham, Norfolk
William Little, London, Brighton and South Coast Railway
Geraldine Livesey, Inspection Assistant Welfare Superintendent, Woolwich Arsenal
Frederick Allen Llewellyn, Assistant Architect, 2nd Class, H.M. Office of Works
William Ewart Llewellyn, Superintendent of Chart Issues, Hydrographic Dept., Admiralty
Daniel Charles Lloyd, Messrs. F. H. Lloyd & Company, Ltd.
Alice Lloyd Jones, Commandant, Cecil Road Auxiliary Hospital, Hale
Thomas Lockwood-Bunce, Technical Inspecting Engineer, Machine Tool Dept., Ministry of Munitions
Edith Annie Lomax, Controller, Women Staff, Military Intelligence Branch, War Office
Arthur Thompson Longbotham, Clerk to the Guardians, Halifax
Arthur Frederick Longdon, Chairman, Derby Local Tribunal
Charles Lupton Lord, Collector of Customs and Excise, Hull
Frederic Reynolds Lovett, Labour Enlistment Complaint Section, Labour Supply Dept., Ministry of Munitions
Catherine Howard Lowe, Commandant, Auxiliary Hospital, New Mills, Derbyshire
Dorothy Ann Shelmerdine Lowe, Commandant, Auxiliary Hospital, Hinton St. George, Crewkerne, Somerset
Robert Luck, Assistant Commandant, Islington Internment Camp
Horace Sampson Lyne, Superintendent, Newport (Mon.) Special Constabulary
Eva Flora Caroline Macdonald
Florence Macdonald, Superintendent of Women Munition Workers Club, Lancaster
John Angus Macdonald  Chairman, Ilkeston Local Tribunal; Member of Ilkeston Local Representative Committee and of Executive Committee of Derbyshire Representative Committee
Walter Mace Macfarlane, of Sir W. G. Armstrong, Whitworth & Company, Ltd.
Archibald Bow Macgregor, Shipyard Manager to Ailsa Shipbuilding Company
John MacGregor, District Superintendent, Caledonian Railway, Aberdeen
Eric Machtig, Second Class Clerk, Colonial Office
John Andrew Macintyre, Assistant Engineer, H.M. Office of Works
Colin MacKay, Station Master, Highland Railway, Inverness
John George Mackay, Member of Appeal Tribunal, Isle of Skye
George Frank Mackrow, Inside Manager, Warship Work, Messrs. R. & W. Hawthorn, Leslie & Company
William Archibald MacLellan, Shop Superintendent, Austin Motor Company, Ltd., Birmingham
John MacQueen, Works Manager on Machinery Side, Messrs. Denny Brothers
Margaret Marsden Macqueen, Assistant Director, Women's Branch, Food Production Dept.
Frank Macers, Chief Assistant, Design and Construction of Explosives Factories, Ministry of Munitions
Melville Pownall Main, In charge of French Section, Allied Branch, Requirements and Statistics Dept., Ministry of Munitions
Adam Maitland  Chairman of City of Aberdeen Local Tribunal Advisory Committee
Agatha Caroline Makins, Commandant, Auxiliary Hospital, Henley-on-Thames
Jeanne Marie Malcolm, Lady Sec. at Headquarters, Y.M.C.A.
William Malcolm, Executive Ofc. for Food Production, Lanarkshire
John Moore Mallett, Personal Assistant to the Director of Works, Admiralty
Frederick Mallinson, Commissioned Auxiliary Fleet Section, Ministry of Shipping
Gerard Noel Cornwallis Mann, Tractor Representative for Norfolk and Suffolk, Food Production Dept.
William Henry Mann, County Director, Tyrone, British Red Cross and Order of St. John of Jerusalem; Treasurer of Our Day Fund in Ulster
Albert John Manning, Senior Clerk, Recruiting Dept., Ministry of National Service
Helen Marchbank, Assistant in British Consulate, Tampico
Ethel Gertrude Marriott, Inspection Welfare Superintendent, Ministry of Munitions, Manchester and East Lancashire
Beatrix Maria Martin, Late Commandant, Auxiliary Hospital, Shrubland Park, Coddenham, Suffolk
Ernest Charles Martin, Head of Labour Supply Section, Food Production Dept.
John Bentick Martin, British Vice-Consul at Trondhjem
William Thomas Mason, Constructive Dept., H.M. Dockyard, Devonport
Joseph Louis Mather, In charge, Artificers Allocation Section, Labour Supply Dept., Ministry of Munitions
William Thomas Matthews, Staff Clerk, War Trade Statistical Dept.
Paul John Mavrogordato, Personal Assistant to Controller, Finance Dept., Ministry of Munitions
Lucy Powys Maybery, Commandant, Voluntary Aid Detachment No. 18, Brecknockshire
William Mayne, Acting Accountant in the War Office
David McCall, Outside Manager of Ayrshire Dockyard Company, Ltd.
George William Richardson McCammon, Royal Corps of Naval Constructors
Gerald Bernard McCormick, Royal Navy, Ordnance Store Dept., Chatham
Maude McGavin, Acting Assistant to the Supervisor of Copying, Colonial Office
James McGowan, Scottish Surveyor of Taxes
Donald McBrayne McLachlan, Outdoor Hull Manager of Submarine Dept., Messrs. Beardmore & Company
Maurice Paterson McLaren, Assistant Engineer, H.M. Office of Works
Esther Fanny McLean, Commandant, Voluntary Aid Detachment No. 154, County of London
Capt. John Reid McLean  Divisional Cmdr., Metropolitan Special Constabulary
Matthew Adam McLean, Shop Superintendent, British Westinghouse Electric and Manufacturing Company, Ltd., Manchester
Norman McManus, Works Manager, Dundee National Shell Factory, Ministry of Munitions
Julia McMordie, President of St. John Voluntary Aid Detachments, Belfast
Alice Margaret Meadows, Superintendent, 606th Motor Transport Company, Army Service Corps
Walter Alfred Medorow, Air Dept., Admiralty
William Melville  Military Intelligence Branch, War Office
Herbert Melville Smith, Manager, King's Norton Filling Factory and National Filling Factory, Abbey Wood, Ministry of Munitions 
Charles Duncan Menzies, Donor of Lynehurst Auxiliary Hospital, West Linton, Peebleshire
Henry John Merriman, Research Dept., Woolwich Arsenal
Edith Minna Metcalfe, Honorary Organising Relief Sec., Chatham Naval Branch, Soldiers' and Sailors' Families Association
John Methven, Assistant Sec. to the City of Dundee Branch, Scottish Branch, British Red Cross Society
John Deeble Michell, Chief Architectural Adviser, War Office
Charles Michie, Representative of the Ministry of Pensions, North Scotland
Ella Morison Millar
Annie Miller, Commandant, The Highlands Auxiliary Hospital, Shortheath, Farnham, Surrey
John Edwin Mills, London and South-Western Railway
Richard Tudor Millward, Exchequer and Audit Dept.
George Milne, Assistant Shipyard Manager of Messrs. Hall, Russell & Company, Ltd.
John Ferguson Milne, Assistant Architect, 2nd Class, H.M. Office of Works
John Robertson Milne, Central Accounts, Finance Dept., Ministry of Munitions
Herbert Samuel Mingard, Assistant Director, Contracts Section, Explosives Supply Dept., Ministry of Munitions
George Bennett Mitchell, Red Cross Transport Ofc., Aberdeen
John Adamson Mitchell, Dockyard Manager, Scotts Shipbuilding and Engineering Company, Ltd., Greenock
Walter Mitchell, Engine Works Manager, Scotts Shipbuilding and Engineering Company, Ltd., Greenock
Alexander George Moffatt, Sectional Cmdr., Swansea Special Constabulary
Annie Maitland Moir, Lady Sec. for Scotland, Y.M.C.A. 
Frederick William Moll, District Inspector of Stores Construction, Ministry of Munitions
Owen Monk, Prisoners of War Dept., Foreign Office
William Dusar Monk, Q.M. of Lewisham Military Hospital
Olive Eleanor Monkhouse, Chief Woman Dilution Ofc., Labour Dept., Ministry of Munitions
Eleanora Montford, Commandant and Matron, Broadway House Auxiliary Hospital, Church Stoke, Montgomeryshire
Isabella Macalister Montgomerie
John Morgan, Superintendent, Stoke-on-Trent Special Constabulary
Arthur Morson, Clerk to the Rugby Urban District Council; Clerk to the Rugby Urban Tribunal and to the Local Representative Committee
Lucy Aylwin Morten-Turner, Commandant, Lady's Close Auxiliary Hospital, Watford
Arthur Herbert Moseley, Sec., Birmingham Munitions Board of Management
George Sinclair Moss, British Consular Assistant, Weihaiwei
Frank Jago Munford, Statistical Dept., Ministry of National Service
Henry Palmer Murphy, Personal Assistant to Controller of Inspection, Ministry of Munitions
Jerome Bernard Murphy, Cunard Agent, Queenstown
James Robertson Murray, British Vice-Consul (Acting Consul), Colon
Maynard Mylrea, Lady Superintendent, Y.M.C.A., Sling Plantation, Salisbury Plain
Harold Walter Naish, Trench Warfare Finances, Finance Dept., Ministry of Munitions
Ada Grace Neame, Commandant, Christchurch Auxiliary Hospital, Beckenham
James Henry Needham, Yard Manager, Messrs. Sir James Laing & Sons
William Nelson, Technical Adviser to Shipyard Labour Dept., Admiralty
Alice Jane Winifred Nicholas, Chief Dairy Instructress, Cornwall County Council
Evelyn Joanna Nicholson, Q.M., Vernon Institute Auxiliary Hospital, Great Saughall, Chester
Capt. John Steel Nicholson, Technical Adviser, Materials and Accessories Branch, Air Board
John Strathdel Nicol, British Explosives Syndicate 
Beatrice Norrie, Lady Superintendent, Giro's Club, and Y.M.C.A. Hostel, London Bridge
James Northam, Admiralty
George H. A. Northcott, Sec. in Charge, Eastern Counties Division, Y.M.C.A. 
Leslie Richard Notley, Assistant, Printing Branch, Ministry of Munitions
Harry Augustus Nott, Electrical Dept., H.M. Dockyard, Devonport
Reuben Oakeshott, Chief of Stores Branch, Woolwich Arsenal
Helen Leslie Ogilvie, Supervisor of Garments for NorthEastern District, Scottish Branch, British Red Cross Society
James William Olive, Superintendent, Metropolitan Police
Arthur O'Reilly, Supervising Clerk, Honours Section of the Military Sec.'s Dept., War Office
John Maurice Orniston, Principal Assistant, Repair Dept., Cammell Laird & Company
Sybil Margaret Orpen, Q.M., Kensington Division, County of London, British Red Cross and Order of St. John of Jerusalem
C. J. Orton, Late Organiser of Shell Forging Distribution, Ministry of Munitions
Ethel Margaret Oswald Oswald, Head Masseuse, Almeric Paget Military Massage Corps
James Thomas Ottewill, Warship Manager in Shipbuilding Dept., Fairfield Shipbuilding and Engineering Company, Ltd.
Eugenie Josephine Oudin, Superintendent, Translation Bureau, War Office
John Albert Owen, South-Eastern and Chatham Railway
Edward Page, Fishery Ofc. of the Sussex Local Sea Fisheries Committee
Sydney David Pallin, Superintendent of Refuge for Belgians at Edmonton
Horace Frank Palmer, Accountant-General's Dept., Admiralty
May Blanche Palmer, Superintendent of Women Munition Workers Hostel, Slades Green
William George Pape, London, Brighton & South Coast Railway
George Herbert Parr, British Vice-Consul, Rio de Janeiro
Janie Ramsbottom Paul, in charge of Red Cross Working Parties in Dumbartonshire
Catherine Swan Paull, Commandant of St. Matthew's Hall Auxiliary Hospital, St. Mary's Road, Willesden
Janet Payne, Organiser and President of the Red Cross Ladies Workroom in Alexandria
Winifred Pead, Administrative Assistant, Contracts Branch, Air Board
Agnes Isobel Pearce, Voluntary Aid Detachment, New Zealand Expeditionary Force
Walter Peel  Member of Liverpool Local Representative Committee
Howard Peet, Superintendent, Signalling Section, Grimsby Special Constabulary
Richard Gall Peirce, Accountant-General's Dept., Admiralty
Henry William Pell, Assistant Engineer, Ministry of Munitions, No. 3 Area (Yorkshire)
Charlie Pelling, Shop Superintendent, Messrs. White, Allom & Company, London
George Henry Perry, Deputy Head Chemist, Inspection Dept., Woolwich Arsenal
Bernard Richard Peters, Assistant Inspector of Gun Ammunition (Technical), Ministry of Munitions
Cecil James Razzell Peters, Assistant Director of Propellant Branch, Explosives Supply Dept., Ministry of Munitions
Walter Bell Pettet, Released Soldiers Records, Labour Supply Dept., Ministry of Munitions
David Phillips, Works Manager, Messrs. Nevill Druce & Company, Llanelly
Henry Dixon Phillips  Chairman, Eastern Counties Division, Y.M.C.A. 
Henry Thomas Phillips, Trench Warfare Contracts, Contracts Dept., Ministry of Munitions
James Falkner Phillips, Civil Assistant, Board of Invention and Research, Admiralty
John Henry Phillips, Personal Assistant to Controller, Labour Regulation Dept., Ministry of Munitions
Walter John Phillips, Senior Examiner, Pay Office
Alice Mabel Pickering, Commandant of Arnold's Auxiliary Voluntary Aid Detachment Hospital, Doncaster
Henry Pilling, Messrs. Galloways Ltd.
The Reverend Arnold Theophilus Biddulph Pinchard, Sec. to the Birmingham Lord Mayor's Committee for Organising Hospitality for Refugees
Charles Pinkham  Chairman, Willesden Local Tribunal
Arthur Piper, Acting Paymaster, Army Pay Dept.
Alfred John Button Pippard, Head of Sub-section in Technical Dept. of Air Board
Charles Russell Pledger, Aeronautics Finance, Finance Dept., Ministry of Munitions
Amy Pomeroy, for executing a task requiring exceptional courage and self-sacrifice
Amy Porter, Commandant, Auxiliary Hospital, Highbury, Birmingham
Francis Martin Potter, Superintendent, H.M. Factory, Penrhyndeudraeth, Ministry of Munitions
Edward Cecil Poultney, in charge, Machine Tool Section, American Branch, Ministry of Munitions
George Power, Sec., Midland Leather Trades Federation
Vernon Hamilton Poynter, Honorary Sec., Committee for Purchase of Army Camp Refuse
Maye Alice Pressley Smith, Shorthand Typist to His Majesty's Legation in Norway
Ernest Price, Supervisor, India Store Depot, India Office
Janet Price-Williams, Honorary Organising Sec., Cardiff Women's Advisory Committee
Ernest Edward Prower, Travelling Inspector, Central Stores Dept., Ministry of Munitions
Henry James Prytherch, Head of Military Office Staff, Great Eastern Railway
Frederick Hayden Purchas, District Stores Superintendent, Manchester, Ministry of Munitions
Henry James Quick, Electrical Dept., H.M. Dockyard, Chatham
Joseph Rogers Quilter, Sec. to the Drapers Chamber of Trade
John Raddiffe, Representative of the Ministry of Pensions, South-West England
George William Rankin, Y.M.C.A. Building Sec.
John Arthur Rankin, Outside Manager of Engine and Boiler Works, Messrs. John Brown & Company, Ltd.
George Daniel Read, Ofc. in Charge of Admiralty Works, Ipswich, Shotley and Yarmouth Districts
Joseph William Reading, Clerk in Registrar-General's Dept.
Annie Bradley Readman, Sec.'s Dept., Admiralty
Maj. Charles Clements Reid, Honorary Sec. and Treasurer, Clackmannan and Kinross, Scottish Branch, British Red Cross Society
Isabella Elizabeth Reid, in charge of Red Cross Rest Room and Hostel at Aberdeen
Clement Unsworth Reynolds, Commandant and Transport Ofc., Stockport Division, British Red Cross Society
William Howe Reynolds, Staff Ofc., Chief Industrial Comm.'s Dept.
Capt. David Mackinlay Potter Roach, Production Ofc., Engines Branch, Air Board
Percy Christopher Rice, Financial Dept., Foreign Office
George Herbert Richardson, Inspector of Clothing, Royal Army Clothing Dept.
Peter Richardson, Member of Appeal Tribunal, Dumbarton
Alfred Charles James Rickett, Private Sec. to Controller, Controlled Establishments Branch, Ministry of Munitions
Graham Stanley Rider, Sub-Section Director, Inland Transport, Ministry of Munitions
Lewis Herbert Rider, Finance Branch, Ministry of Shipping
Patrick Riordan, Superintendent of Registry, Board of Agriculture
Arthur Henry Riseley, Honorary Sec., Bristol Citizens Recruiting Committee
Sir James William Ritchie  Divisional Cmdr., Metropolitan Special Constabulary
Ernest Roberts, Manchester War Pensions Committee
Herbert Wallace Roberts, Chief Chemist, H.M. Factory, Qualferry, Ministry of Munitions
Robert Henry Robertshaw, Junior Clerk, Civil Service Commission
John Robertson, Lanarkshire Miners Union, Member of Collier Recruiting Court, Lanarkshire
James Constable Robertson  Town Councillor of Dundee
Winifred Agnes Florence Robertson, Director of Statistics Dept., Admiralty 
George Lovely Robinson, Outside Manager, Messrs. Fletcher, Son & Fearnall
William Charles Robinson, Superintendent, Metropolitan Police
James Robson  President of Durham Miners Association; Assessor to the Colliery Recruiting Court
George James Nicholas Rogers, Clerk, Local Government Board
Richard Hawke Rogers, Messrs. Smith & Sons, Ltd.
Thomas Edward Rogers, Outside Iron Manager, Messrs. Swan, Hunter & Wigham Richardson, Ltd.
William Romney, Agent in Charge of Folkestone Harbour, South-Eastern and Chatham Railway
James Francis Ronca, Board of Trade
Edith Rose, Sec. of Lord Mayor's Committee, Liverpool, for reception, care and maintenance of refugees
Jane Rossall, Commandant and Principal Founder, The Star Hills Auxiliary Hospital, Lytham
James MacKean Rowbotham, in charge of Shell Forging Section, Ministry of Munitions
Arthur Maynard Rowland, Chief Technical Assistant for Optical Machinery, Machine Tool Dept., Ministry of Munitions
Mildred Rowley, Commandant, Voluntary Aid Detachment No. 42, Histon Auxiliary Hospital, Cambridgeshire
Henry George Rowlinson  Forest of Dean Miners Association; Member of Colliery Recruiting Court, Forest of Dean
Harry James Roworth, Statistical Branch, Gun Ammunition Dept., Ministry of Munitions
Arthur Albert Rowse, Late Head Trench Warfare Engineer, Ministry of Munitions, No. 4 Area Midlands
Thomas Wright Royle, London Confidential Assistant to Superintendent of the Line, Lancashire and Yorkshire Railway
Herbert Llewellyn Rutter  Ofc. in Charge of Wounded Convoys, Northumberland
The Hon. Lockhart Matthew St. Clair  Divisional Cmdr., Metropolitan Special Constabulary
Ella Victoire Sandeman, Ofc. in Charge, The Crescent Auxiliary Hospital, Hayling Island
Walter Anthony Sargent, Midland Railway
Harold Eustace Satow, His Britannic Majesty's Consul, Larissa
Edward Saunders  Mayor of Harwich; Chairman of the Harwich Food Control Committee and of the Local Representative Committee
George William Saunders, Ships Requisitioning Branch, Ministry of Shipping
Thomas Arthur Saunders, Clerk in Registrar-General's Dept.
Ernst Schiff, Manager of the Poland Street Refuge for Belgian Refugees and Member of the Jewish Refugee Committee
Hubert Arthur Secretan, Naval Sea Transport Branch, Ministry of Shipping
James Seddon, Commandant, Ashton-under-Lyne Special Constabulary
Walter Sexton, Organiser of Transport Service, Dublin, British Red Cross and Order of St. John of Jerusalem
Lettice Seymour, Commandant, Hill Crest Auxiliary Hospital, Coventry
Thomas George Shacklady, Messrs. Curtis & Harvey, Ltd.
Ethel Mary Reader Shakespear  Birmingham War Pensions Committee
Matthew Joseph Sheridan, Collector of Customs and Excise, Newcastle
Percy Thomas Shorey, Confidential Clerk, Home Office
Robert Siddle, Sec., Amalgamated Society of Leather Workers
Herbert Sidebottom, Superintendent, Remount Service
Arthur Molyneux Sillar, Assistant Superintending Engineer, Ministry of Munitions, No. 7 Area (Metropolitan)
Percy Simmonds, Acting Paymaster, Army Pay Dept.
John Leonard Simpson, Messrs. A. Harper, Sons & Bean, Ltd.
George Greig Sinclair, Acting Civil Engineer, in charge of Works, Royal Naval Air Service, Central Depot, Cranwell
William Sacheverell Sitwell, Clerk to the Cornwall Appeal Tribunal and Sec. to the County Patriotic Fund
Edward John Skinner, Electrical Engineer, Fairfield Shipbuilding and Engineering Company
James Cameron Smail, Organiser of Trade Schools under the Education Committee of the London County Council; District Manager, Metropolitan Munitions Committee
Alexander Smith, Assistant Shipyard Manager, Messrs. Vickers, Ltd.
Albert Smith, Head Master of the Westville Road Council School, Hammersmith
Clarence Dalrymple Smith
Frank William Smith, Head of Military Traffic Dept., Great Central Railway
Gladys Augusta Smith, Private Sec. to Acting Chief of British War Mission in U.S.A.
Harold Smith, Shop Superintendent, Messrs. Mather & Platt, Ltd., Manchester
Harold Robert Smith, Honorary Sec., Suffolk Auxiliary Hospital, Ampton Hall, Bury St. Edmunds
James Alfred Smith, Staff Clerk, Colonial Office
Rodney Smith, Y.M.C.A. Worker
Sydney Smith, Assistant Engineer, Ministry of Munitions, No. 4 Area (Midlands)
Francis Watson Smyth, Acting Paymaster, Army Pay Dept.
John Snell, Inspector, Horticultural Branch, Board of Agriculture
Frederick Cousins Snowden, Q.M. of the Hammersmith Military Hospital
John Sommerville, Senior Bond Ofc., Shepherd's Bush, Ministry of Munitions
Wilfrid Guy Spear, Private Sec. to the Accountant-General of the Navy
Edward Francis Spiller, in charge, Registry and Accommodation, Ministry of Munitions, Grand Hotel, etc.
Edward Tom Springate, Traffic Agent, Newhaven, London, Brighton and South Coast Railway
Samuel Springer, Head of the General Dept., Foreign Trade Dept.
Joseph Cooper Squirrell, Chief of Emergency Division, Ipswich Special Constabulary
Fanny Stacey, Commandant, Auxiliary Hospital, Bishop's Stortford
John Stafford, Class A Clerk, War Office
James William Stafford, Passport Dept., Foreign Office
Louis Donald Stansfield, Royal Corps of Naval Constructors
The Reverend Richard Staple, Chief Ofc., Canterbury Special Constabulary
William Edgar Stephens, Town Clerk, Great Yarmouth; Clerk to the Great Yarmouth Local Tribunal
Herbert Given Stevenson, Representative of the Ministry of Pensions, North Ireland
Elizabeth Woodhead Stewart, Voluntary Aid Detachment, New Zealand Expeditionary Force
Carruthers Jean Stewart, Organising Sec. for the North of England, Munition Workers Welfare Committee, Y.W.C.A.
John Stewart, Sec., West Perthshire District Food Production Committee
Robert Stewart, Postmaster, Margate
Ernest Henry Stall, Messrs. W. W. Still & Sons, Ltd.
Richard Albert Stokes, Manager, Morecambe National Filling Factory, Ministry of Munitions
Ethel Mary Hutton Storey, County Sec., Voluntary Aid Detachments, County of Durham
John Storey  First Assistant Astronomer, Royal Observatory, Scotland; now serving in the Dept. of the Director of Naval Ordnance, Admiralty
Irene Strevens, Chief Superintendent of Women Clerks in Casualty Section, War Office
Ernest Edward Stringer, Registrar of the Foreign Trade Dept.
John Stubbs, Principal, Hughes-Stubbs Metal Company, Birmingham
Ellen Elizabeth Stuckey, Voluntary Aid Detachment, New Zealand Expeditionary Force
Harold Sumner, Assistant County Director, East Lancashire, British Red Cross Society
Capt. Lewis George Sydenham, Ministry of National Service
Mary Louisa Sykes, Organiser and Donor, Auxiliary Hospital, Cross Hawell, Rossett, Denbighshire
Percy Duncan Sykes, Contract Dept., Admiralty
Percy James Symmons, in charge of Movement of Materials, Central Stores Dept., Ministry of Munitions
Charles Crump Tancock, Superintendent, Docks Station, Southampton
John Reuben Tapp, Acting Victualling Store Ofc., Aberdeen
Grace Rosina Tasker, in charge of Clothing Depot for Stirlingshire, Scottish Branch, British Red Cross Society
Mary Beatrice Churchill Tayler, Clerk, Intelligence Branch, Procurator-General's Dept.
Alice Maud Rowson Taylor, Commandant, Windy Knowe Auxiliary Hospital, Blundellsands, West Lancashire
Arthur Thomas Taylor, Assistant Principal Ofc., Sugar Distribution Branch, Ministry of Food
Charles Taylor, Accountant-General's Dept., Admiralty
Esther Hilda Taylor, Private Sec. to the Sec. of the Ministry of National Service
George Wilson Taylor, Clerk to the Central (Unemployed) Body, for London; Clerk to the London Appeal Tribunal and Special Tribunal
Percy Taylor, Chief Examiner, War Office
Charles Temperley, Cmdr. and Transport Ofc., Metropolitan Special Constabulary
Dorothy Mary Gladys Temperley, Assistant, Historical Section, Requirements and Statistics Dept., Ministry of Munitions
Charlton Thew, Works Manager, Messrs. Hawthorn, Leslie & Company
Arthur Augustus Thomas, Military Representative, Holloway Tribunal
Olive Morton Thomas, Private Sec. to the Chairman of the War Trade Intelligence Dept.
George Thompson, Managing Director, Messrs. H. W. Ward & Company, Ltd., Birmingham
Adam Robert Thomson, First Division Clerk, Railway Dept., Board of Trade
Archibald Thomson, Outside Manager of Messrs. William Hamilton & Company, Ltd.
Margaret Eleanor Thomson, Cmdr. in Charge, Auxiliary Hospital, Penrith
John Samuel Alphonso McCoan Thornhill, Chief Superintendent of the Map Printing Dept. of the Ordnance Survey of the United Kingdom
Reginald Ernest Thornley, Assistant Principal Ofc., Establishment Section, Ministry of Food
Hannah Maud Taylor Thorpe, Commandant, Voluntary Aid Detachment No. 42, Nottinghamshire
Hugh Kingsmill Neville Thurston, Cmdr., Plymouth Special Constabulary
Hugh Gorham Ticehurst, Thames Ammunition Works, Erith
Violet Beatrice Till, Commandant and Organiser of Nurses Hostel, Surrey
Henry Tom, British Vice-Consul, Rotterdam
Marion Tomkinson, Commandant, Auxiliary Hospital, The Larches, Kidderminster
John Tourtel, Assistant Inspector of Munitions, U.S.A.
Arthur Henry Towle, First Class Surveyor of Taxes, Inland Revenue
Lucy Mabel Townsend, in charge of Hospital Surgical Supply Depot, Scottish Branch, British Red Cross Society
Anna Townshend, Commandant, Auxiliary Hospital, The Hermitage, Solihull
Edward John Tozer, Chief Registrar, Controller's Dept., Admiralty
Gwendoline Chenevix-Trench, Administrator, Fenrhyn Cottage Auxiliary Hospital, Carnarvonshire
Rosamond, Baroness Trevor, Donor and Organiser, Brynkinalt Auxiliary Hospital, Chirk, Denbighshire
William Burrows Trick  Chairman, Neath Rural District Council; Chairman, Neath Rural Local Tribunal
Oliver Trigger, Deputy Head Chemist, Inspection Dept., Woolwich Arsenal
Harry Woodward Trotter, Committee Clerk, Customs and Excise
Ada Mary Turner, Superintendent of Women Munition Workers Club, Gravesend
Maj. George Bankart Turner, Engineer in Charge of Production, Royal Aircraft Factory
Helen Turner, Matron of the Central Work Rooms, Royal Academy
William Henry Turton, Manager, Gun and Carriage Factories, Woolwich Arsenal
James Tweedale, Works Manager, Messrs. T. Robinson & Sons, Ltd., Railway Works, Rochdale
Walter Gerald Vann, Sec. of the British Farmers Fund
George Vardy, Engine Works Manager, Messrs. Swan, Hunter & Wigham Richardson, Ltd., Wallsend-on-Tyne
John Varley, Chief Investigator, Machine Tool Dept., Ministry of Munitions
Arthur Ronald Vaughan, Assistant to Engineering Manager, Messrs. Cammell Laird and Company, Ltd.
Ruth Sarah Vigers, Assistant Sec., Ofc.s (Convalescent Homes Dept., British Red Cross and Order of St. John
Harold Decimus Vigor, Sec., Royal Commission on Wheat Supplies
Albert William Viney, Shop Manager, Royal Naval Torpedo Factory, Greenock
Nancy Lycett, Baroness Vivian, Lady Superintendent, Y.M.C.A. Hut, Euston
Francis Richard Wade, Assistant Inspector of Gun Ammunition (Supervisory), Ministry of Munitions
Edward Waggott, Sir W. G. Armstrong, Whitworth & Company, Ltd.
Col. Charles Richard Wainwright  Chairman, Ashton-under-Lyne Local Tribunal
Alice May Waite, Private Sec. to Controller, Optical Munitions, Glassware and Potash Production, Ministry of Munitions
Alexander Mann Walker, Divisional Cmdr., West Riding Special Constabulary
Charles Edmund Walker, Messrs. J. Stone and Company
John Drummond Walker, Naval Sea Transport Branch, Ministry of Shipping
John Frederick Walker, Royal Corps of Naval Constructors
Maria Edith Walker, Commandant, Voluntary Aid Detachment No. 24, Auxiliary Hospital, Spilsby, Lincolnshire
Robert Walker, Late Private Sec. to Director-General of Inspection of Munitions
Augusta Maud Wallace
Robert Wallis, Works Manager, Wallsend Slipway and Engineering Company
John Thomas Walton, Shop Superintendent, Woolsey Sheep Shearing Machine Company, Limited, Birmingham
Caroline Theodora Ward, Commandant of Burntwood Auxiliary Hospital, Caterham
Charles Wardle, Sec. of the Nottingham Lace Workers Union
Percy Thomas Wardle, Sec., Messrs. William Muir and Co., Ltd., Manchester
Arthur Glyn Watkins, Manager, Gloucester Filling Factory, Ministry of Munitions
Thomas Percival Holmes Watkins, Clerk to the Guardians, Pontypool; Clerk to the Panteg Local Tribunal
Isabella Clark Watson, Voluntary Aid Detachment, New Zealand Expeditionary Force
William George Watson, Constructive Dept., Pembroke Dock
Henry Charles Watts, Head of Sub-Section of Air Board, Technical Dept.
Adam Weatherhead, Superintendent, Middlesbrough Special Constabulary
Ella Gertrude Amy Webb  Lady District Superintendent, St. John Ambulance Brigade, Dublin
Ellen, Lady Webb, Donor and Commandant, Llwynarthan Auxiliary Hospital, Castleton, Cardiff
Herbert Stephen Webb, Naval Store Dept., Admiralty
Walter Weighell, Contraband Dept. Registry
George Jackson Weir, Factory Accounts, Finance Dept., Ministry of Munitions
Cecile Campbell Welsh
James Hales West, Superintendent, Metropolitan Police
John Lowe Westland, Surveyor, Director of Works Dept., Admiralty
Edith Ivy Weston
Thomas Angas Wheatley, Messrs. Beck & Company
Alfred James Whitby, Staff Clerk, Finance Division, H.M. Office of Works
Arthur White, Superintendent, Metropolitan Police
Jesse Obadiah White, Constructive Dept., H.M. Dockyard, Chatham
Percy Ernest White, Senior Ofc., Portsmouth Special Constabulary
Professor Robert George White  Technical Adviser, Food Production Dept.
Gerald Whiting, Yard Manager, Messrs. Sir W. G. Armstrong, Whitworth & Company, Ltd.
George Jackson Whitten, Surveyor (Permanent), War Office
Lt.-Col. Herbert John Whittle, Ministry of National Service
Christopher Henry George Wilkinson, Naval Store Dept., Admiralty
Charles Robert Thomas Williams, Late Assistant Director, Enrolled Labour Section, Labour Supply Dept., Ministry of Munitions
Ernest Graham Williams, Naval Sea Transport Branch, Ministry of Shipping
Isabel Rose Williams, Lady Superintendent, Y.M.C.A. Hut, Waterloo Road
Elizabeth Williams Wynn, County Sec., Denbigh and Flintshire, British Red Cross and Order of St. John of Jerusalem
Rose Willson, Donor and late Commandant of Ranceby Ball Auxiliary Hospital, Grantham
Harry Gouldie Wilson  Accountant-General's Dept., Admiralty
William Wilson, Outside Manager, Northumberland Shipbuilding Company
Rowland Winn, Tractor Representative for Yorkshire, Food Production Dept.
Henry Elsbury Winter, Sergeant, Carlisle Special Constabulary
Constance Evelyn Winwood Smith, Personal Assistant to Director of Supply and Production, Air Board
Percy Furlong Wise, Inspector of Gun Ammunition (Supervisory), Ministry of Munitions
Ralph Wolfenden, Assistant, National Physical Laboratory
Frances Mary Wood, Contracts Branch, War Office
Lt. Thomas Wood, in charge of Red Cross Motor Repair Works, Boulogne
Charles Merllynn Woodford, Organiser of the War Trade Dept. Registry
Amy Wood-Hill, Commandant, Auxiliary Hospital, Beccles, Suffolk
Charlie Roland Woods, Sec. of the Horse Rationing Committee and of the Board of Trade Iron and Steel Committee
Irene Woodyear, Military Intelligence Branch, War Office
Frank George Woollard, Technical Director of Messrs. E. G. Wrigley & Company, Ltd., Birmingham
Andrew Charles Woolmer, Superintendent, H.M. Factory, Swindon, Ministry of Munitions
Walter John Wotton, Electrical Dept., H.M. Dockyard, Devonport
Henry Wright, First Class Surveyor of Taxes, Inland Revenue
Professor Mark Robinson Wright, Chairman of Whitley and Monkseaton Local Tribunal
William Wright, Engineer to the Trustees of the Crystal Palace
William Wright, Y.M.C.A., Sec. for Ireland
Leonard Graveney Wykes, Sec., Machine Tool Advisory Committee, Ministry of Munitions
Nora Wynne, Welfare Worker and Head of Munition Workers Hostel, Luton
David Wilberforce-Young, Inspector, Forestry Branch, Board of Agriculture
Edward Willie Young, Honorary Sec. and Organiser, County of Middlesex, British Red Cross Society
George Young, Inspector, Cardiff Special Constabulary
Patricia Young
Thomas Young, Executive Ofc. for Food Production, County of Fife
Walter Youngman, Freight of Stores Section, Ministry of Shipping

For services in connection with the War in France, Egypt and Salonika —
Capt. Nevill Anderson, Deputy Assistant Adjutant-General, British Expeditionary Force
Madeleine Beasley, Organiser and Controller of a Canteen, British Expeditionary Force
Arthur Beeby-Thompson, in charge of Deep Well Boring Park, British Salonika Force
The Hon. Phyllis Hermione Coke, in charge of Young Men's Christian Association arrangements at 3rd Army Rest Camp
James Lawrence Hay, Sec., Young Men's Christian Association, New Zealand Division
Verania MacPhillamy, Assistant Superintendent of the Soldiers' Club and Rest Camp, Kantara Railway Station, Egypt
William Owens, Supervising Field Sec., Young Men's Christian Association, Egyptian Expeditionary Force
John William Swithen-bank, Young Men's Christian Association XVIII Corps, British Expeditionary Force

British India
Lilian Barton 
Deaconess Margaret Durell, lately in charge Soldiers Home, Peshawar and Cherat
Kate Thubron
May McCarthy
Edith Spencer, Nursing Sister, His Highness the Maharaja Somalia's Convalescent Home, Nairobi, East Africa
Florence Maria Wyld, Principal of the Mahbubia Girls School, Hyderabad
Herbert Ruben Bird, Manager, Office of Military Sec. to His Excellency the Governor of Madras
Rao Bahadur Rango Govind Naik, Pleader, Bombay
Lt. Charles Edward Miller Judge, Indian Army Reserve of Ofc.s, Supply and Transport Corps, Army Headquarters
Frank Henry Jones, First Engineer of the Cable Steamer Patrick Stewart

Commonwealth of Australia
Albert Sydney Austin, for services in Australia in connection with the Australian Branch of the British Red Cross Society
Hugh V. E. Calthrop, for services oversea in connection with the Australian Branch of the British Bed Cross Society
H. C. Cave, for services oversea in connection with the Australian Branch of the British Red Cross Society
Ida Florence Dean, for services in Australia in connection with the Australian Branch of the British Red Cross Society
Frank De Boise, for services oversea in connection with the Australian Branch of the British Red Cross Society
Thomas Percy Draper, for services in Australia in connection with the Australian Branch of the British Red Cross Society
Kate Egan, for services in Australia in connection with the Australian Branch of the British Red Cross Society
E. G. Elworthy, for services oversea in connection with the Australian Branch of the British Red Cross Society
W. J. Isbister, for services oversea in connection with the Australian Branch of the British Red Cross Society
Ethel Laidley, for services in Australia in connection with the Australian Branch of the British Red Cross Society
W. T. Robertson, for services in Australia in connection with the Australian Branch of the British Red Cross Society
Capt. Robert Albert Dunbar Sinclair, for services oversea in connection with the Australian Branch of the British Red Cross Society
Lillias Margaret Skene, for services in Australia in connection with the Australian Branch of the British Red Cross Society
Nancy Consett Stephen, for services in Australia in connection with the Australian Branch of the British Red Cross Society
Charles A. de Messurier Walker, Honorary Sec., Australian Comforts Fund

Egypt and the Sudan
Pye Moore, Nursing Sister, Khartoum Civilian Hospital
Edward Oliver Heywood Fulford, Works Manager, Blue Nile Irrigation
John Ball  Chief Inspector of Geological Survey
Allen Calder Potts, Works Manager, Sudan Steamers Dept.
Sydney Dennett, Superintending Engineer, Sudan Posts and Telegraphs Dept.
John McIntosh, Works Manager, Locomotive Shops, Egyptian State Railways
George Douglas, Superintendent, Photographic Office, Survey Dept.
Herbert Mason, Inspector in Veterinary Service of Ministry of Agriculture
Burton Pearson, Divisional Traffic Superintendent, Egyptian State Railways
George Burnett Middleton, Mechanical Service, Public Works Dept.
Henry Wilfrid Skelly, Works Manager, Government Press
Percy Weaver, Assistant Divisional Traffic Superintendent
George Boxall, Dockyard Engineer, Port Sudan
Dominion of New Zealand
Emma Bissland
Ann Burgess
Jean Burt
Sarah Ann Coradine
Harriette Sophia Crawford
George Lester Donaldson
John William Ellis
Edith Fenton
Elizabeth Forrester
Hope Gibbons
Florence Guinness
Margaret Harding
Leah Lucy Hawke
Douglas William Jack
Mary Hawkins Kirkpatrick
Victor John Larner
Kate Rose Leaver
Edward George Levinge
Isabel McLean
Arthur Edward Manning
Col. William Henry Sefton Moorhouse, Dominion Sec. of the New Zealand Branch of the British Red Cross Society and Order of St. John of Jerusalem
Elizabeth Lily Nash
Arihia Kane Ngata
George Albert Perry
Herbert James Duncan Robertson
Iris Brenda Rolleston
Alice Georgina Sherratt
Jean Simpson
William Wallace Snodgrass
Belle Spedding
William Stead
Maurice Thompson
Patricia Clay Thomson
Charles John Treleaven 
Arthur Varney, General Sec., Young Men's Christian Association, New Zealand
Georgina Webster

Newfoundland
William Walker Blackall  a Superintendent of Education, for services in connection with recruiting
Vincent Patrick Burke  a Superintendent of Education, for services in connection with recruiting
The Reverend Levi Curtis  a Superintendent of Education, for services in connection with recruiting
Elizabeth Selina Green, for services in connection with the Newfoundland War Contingent Association
Annie Hayward, for services in connection with the Women's Patriotic Association
Mary McKay, for services in connection with the Women's Patriotic Association
Eliza Mary Jane Morris, for services in connection with the Newfoundland War Contingent Association
Frank Steer, Honorary Sec. of the Imperial Red Cross Fund in Newfoundland

Union of South Africa
Ezra John Barnett, for services in connection with the South African Railways Rest Room, Johannesburg
Lucy Dorothea Bourne, of Red Cross and Comforts Committees, Pretoria
William Beale Calder, for services in connection with the Governor-General's Fund, Durban
Herbert Ernest Clark, Honorary Sec., Kimberley Committee, GovernorGeneral's Fund
Francis George Clarkson, Honorary Sec., Grahamstown Committee, Governor-General's Fund
Paul Dietrich Cluver, Mayor of Stellenbosch
John Dougall, Honorary Treasurer, Governor-General's Fund
Robert Dunlop, af the Natal Branch of the Governor-General's Fund
Eveline Mary Duquemin, for services in connection with the Governor-General's Fund
John Fairlbairn, Joint Honorary Sec., Bed Cross, South Africa
Pieter Jacobus van Breda Faure, ex-Mayor of Bloemfontein
Laura Vivienne Fraser, of the Comforts Committee, De Aar
Grace Christian Friedlander, President and Hon. Sec. of the South African Work Booms, London
Constantino William Giovanetti, Mayor of Pretoria
Alexander Forsyth Girdwood, Port Goods Superintendent, Cape Town
Willoughiby How, Honorary Sec., Port Elizabeth Local Committee of the Governor-General's Fund
Edwin Gilbert Izod, South African War Market Committee, Johannesburg
John Chambers Jemsley, Mayor of Port Elizabeth
Elizabeth Evelyn Martin, of the Red Cross Committee, Cape Town
Justina Wilhelrnina Nancy Moller, of the Comforts Committee, Johannesburg
Susan Ann Murray, of the Red Cross Committee, Bloemfontein
Maria Nuttall, for services in connection with the Governor-General's Fund, Durban
John Orr, Mayor of Kimberley
Mary Jeannette Parker, of the Women's Patriotic League, Pietermaritzburg
Thomas Samuel Parkyns, for war services on the railways of the South-West Africa Protectorate
Catherine Mary Bees, Member of War Work Committees, East London
Frederick Rowland, Joint Honorary Sec., Red Cross, South Africa
Emma Jane Searle, of the Red Cross Committee, Cape Town
Thomas Sleith, General Manager, Union Defence Forces Institute
Richard Walter Stowe, for war services in the South African Railway Workshops, Cape Town
Percy Henry Taylor, Mayor of Pietermaritzburg
Arthur Walter Townshend, Chairman, Visiting Troops Entertainment Committee, Cape Town
Kate Amy van der Bijl, of the Red Cross and Comforts Committees, Cape Town
Rose Lilian Vintcent, of the South African Comforts Committee, London
John Henry Weaver, Chief Censor for the Union of South Africa
Charles Winser, Honorary Sec., Natal Red Cross

Crown Colonies, Protectorates, etc. 
Lt.-Col. Edward Bell, Chief Inspector of Police and Commandant of Local Forces, Leeward Islands
Marie Bouavia, for services to the sick, wounded and poor in Malta
Ellen Bowen, for services to War Charities in Barbados
Ada Ellen Briscoe, local representative in Jamaica of Queen Mary's Needlework Guild
Robert Randal Bruce, Receiver-General, Harbour Master and Shipping Master, Saint Helena
John Borlase Cassels, for Red Cross Services in British Guiana
Harry Hardman Cannell, Honorary Sec., The Oversea Forces Reception Committee
Marie Clumeck, for services to War Charities in the Straits Settlements
Frederick Appleton Collymore, for services in connection with the Red Cross Motor Ambulance Fund, Barbados
Katharine Cook, Matron, Church Missionary Society Hospital, Kampala, Uganda Protectorate
Emanuel Henry Cummings, Mayor of Freetown, Sierra Leone
Judith de Cordova, for services in connection with War Charities and recruiting in Jamaica
Annie Jane Douglas, Matron of the Government Lunatic Asylum, Kingston, Jamaica, for services on behalf of War Charities and recruiting
Christopher Robert Burroughs Draper, Magistrate and District Comm., Northern Rhodesia
Matthew McKean Fitzpatrick, Senior Engineer, Marine Dept., Nigeria, for services in connection with the salvage of vessels at Duala
Harry Kaye Cecil Fisher, of the Eastern Extension, Australasia and China Telegraph Company, for services to the Government of the Straits Settlements
Capt. Percy Louis Alexander Fraser, Superintendent of Prisons, Trinidad
Maj. John Morton Fremantle, Resident of Muri, Nigeria, for services in connection with the Cameroon Campaign
Edward Basil Herbert Goodall, Native Comm., Northern Rhodesia
Eugene Patrick Griffin, Chief Clerk, Colonial Sec.'s Office, Gibraltar
John Pierce Hand, Organiser of the "600" Club in aid of returned soldiers, Bermuda Islands
Robert Oliphant Hutchison, Superintendent of Imports and Exports, Colony of Hong Kong
Agnes Norah Johnson, Honorary Sec. of the Bahamian Red Cross Guild
Edgar Anderson Averaye Jones, Magistrate and District Comm., Northern Rhodesia
Tereza Mary Kearney, Mother Superior, Mill Hill Mission, Uganda Protectorate
Vrasidas Demitriou Lanitis, Senior Clerk, District Administration, Cyprus
Lee Choon Guan, for services to War charities in the Straits Settlements
Elizabeth Ann Lofthouse, for services to War charities in the Bahama Islands
George Graham Percy Lyons, Magistrate and District Comm., Northern Rhodesia
Anne Gill Mifsud, Lady Superintendent of the Nursing Division of the St. John's Ambulance Brigade, Malta
Mary Moseley, Honorary Sec. of the Ladies' Committee in London for the British West Indies Reg.
Walter Frederick Nutt, of the Straits Trading Company, for services in the Federated Malay States
Henry Bradshaw Popham, District Political Ofc. in the British Sphere of Occupation in Togoland
Robert Sutherland Rattray, District Political Ofc. in the British Sphere of Occupation in Togoland
Maria Jean Reid, Chairman of the Red Cross Committee, Nyasaland
Arthur Thomas Rivers, Honorary Treasurer of the Oversea Forces Reception Committee
Herbert St. John Sheppard, Senior Assistant Auditor, Nigeria, for services in connection with the Cameroon Campaign
Capt. William Blakeney Stanley, First Class District Comm., Sierra Leone
John James Toogood, Member of the Claims Board; East Africa Protectorate
Capt. Frederic Thomas George Tremlett, Deputy Inspector-General of Police, Mauritius
Ada Mary Tucker, for services to the Bermuda Contingents
Archibald Rhys Usher, Member of the Legislative Council of the Colony of British Honduras and Chairman of the British Honduras Contingent Society
Gustavus William Webster, Resident of Yola, Nigeria, for services in connection with the Cameroon Campaign
Capt. Charles Edward Wells, Chairman of the Rhodesia Employment Bureau for returned soldiers
Thomas Alfred Wood, Member of the Claims Board, East Africa Protectorate

Honorary Members
Sir Apolo Kagwa  Prime Minister of Buganda
Edward Sulemani Kahaya, King of Ankole; Andereya Juhaga, King of Bunyoru; and Dandi Kasagama, King of Toro; For services in raising and organising native levies and local Defence Corps, Uganda Protectorate
Sayyid Ahmed el Morghani, Notable of Kassala
El Sherif Yusef El Hindi, Notable
Yacbub Bey Fahmy, Station Superintendent, Cairo Station
Attilio Nani, Postmaster, Port Said
Ibraham Bey Dimitri, Sudan Service

References

New Year Honours
1918 awards
1918 in Australia
1918 in Canada
1918 in India
1918 in New Zealand
1918 in the United Kingdom